

602001–602100 

|-bgcolor=#d6d6d6
| 602001 ||  || — || December 27, 2013 || Piszkesteto || K. Sárneczky ||  || align=right | 2.3 km || 
|-id=002 bgcolor=#E9E9E9
| 602002 ||  || — || October 24, 2005 || Mauna Kea || Mauna Kea Obs. ||  || align=right data-sort-value="0.74" | 740 m || 
|-id=003 bgcolor=#E9E9E9
| 602003 ||  || — || January 9, 2014 || Haleakala || Pan-STARRS ||  || align=right | 1.8 km || 
|-id=004 bgcolor=#E9E9E9
| 602004 ||  || — || December 25, 2013 || Catalina || CSS ||  || align=right | 1.4 km || 
|-id=005 bgcolor=#E9E9E9
| 602005 ||  || — || December 25, 2013 || Kitt Peak || Spacewatch ||  || align=right data-sort-value="0.71" | 710 m || 
|-id=006 bgcolor=#E9E9E9
| 602006 ||  || — || January 2, 2014 || Kitt Peak || Spacewatch ||  || align=right | 2.4 km || 
|-id=007 bgcolor=#E9E9E9
| 602007 ||  || — || January 2, 2014 || Kitt Peak || Spacewatch ||  || align=right | 1.6 km || 
|-id=008 bgcolor=#E9E9E9
| 602008 ||  || — || December 20, 2004 || Kitt Peak || Spacewatch ||  || align=right | 1.6 km || 
|-id=009 bgcolor=#E9E9E9
| 602009 ||  || — || January 12, 2014 || Mount Lemmon || Mount Lemmon Survey ||  || align=right | 1.2 km || 
|-id=010 bgcolor=#E9E9E9
| 602010 ||  || — || January 2, 2014 || Kitt Peak || Spacewatch ||  || align=right data-sort-value="0.96" | 960 m || 
|-id=011 bgcolor=#fefefe
| 602011 ||  || — || January 2, 2014 || Catalina || CSS ||  || align=right | 1.0 km || 
|-id=012 bgcolor=#d6d6d6
| 602012 ||  || — || January 7, 2014 || Mount Lemmon || Mount Lemmon Survey ||  || align=right | 1.9 km || 
|-id=013 bgcolor=#E9E9E9
| 602013 ||  || — || January 12, 2014 || Mount Lemmon || Mount Lemmon Survey ||  || align=right | 1.1 km || 
|-id=014 bgcolor=#E9E9E9
| 602014 ||  || — || December 2, 2013 || Oukaimeden || M. Ory ||  || align=right | 1.7 km || 
|-id=015 bgcolor=#fefefe
| 602015 ||  || — || December 31, 2013 || Kitt Peak || Spacewatch ||  || align=right data-sort-value="0.81" | 810 m || 
|-id=016 bgcolor=#FA8072
| 602016 ||  || — || January 21, 2014 || Haleakala || Pan-STARRS || H || align=right data-sort-value="0.50" | 500 m || 
|-id=017 bgcolor=#E9E9E9
| 602017 ||  || — || December 11, 2013 || Mount Lemmon || Mount Lemmon Survey ||  || align=right | 1.6 km || 
|-id=018 bgcolor=#d6d6d6
| 602018 ||  || — || February 4, 2009 || Kitt Peak || Spacewatch ||  || align=right | 2.5 km || 
|-id=019 bgcolor=#E9E9E9
| 602019 ||  || — || December 13, 2013 || Mount Lemmon || Mount Lemmon Survey ||  || align=right | 1.3 km || 
|-id=020 bgcolor=#fefefe
| 602020 ||  || — || September 12, 2002 || Palomar || NEAT ||  || align=right data-sort-value="0.44" | 440 m || 
|-id=021 bgcolor=#E9E9E9
| 602021 ||  || — || November 18, 2008 || Kitt Peak || Spacewatch ||  || align=right | 1.2 km || 
|-id=022 bgcolor=#E9E9E9
| 602022 ||  || — || September 24, 2008 || Kitt Peak || Spacewatch ||  || align=right | 1.2 km || 
|-id=023 bgcolor=#E9E9E9
| 602023 ||  || — || December 26, 2013 || Mount Lemmon || Mount Lemmon Survey ||  || align=right | 1.0 km || 
|-id=024 bgcolor=#E9E9E9
| 602024 ||  || — || December 20, 2004 || Mount Lemmon || Mount Lemmon Survey ||  || align=right | 2.0 km || 
|-id=025 bgcolor=#E9E9E9
| 602025 ||  || — || January 23, 2014 || Mount Lemmon || Mount Lemmon Survey ||  || align=right | 1.2 km || 
|-id=026 bgcolor=#d6d6d6
| 602026 ||  || — || January 24, 2014 || Haleakala || Pan-STARRS ||  || align=right | 2.3 km || 
|-id=027 bgcolor=#d6d6d6
| 602027 ||  || — || September 20, 2011 || Haleakala || Pan-STARRS ||  || align=right | 2.8 km || 
|-id=028 bgcolor=#E9E9E9
| 602028 ||  || — || January 1, 2014 || Haleakala || Pan-STARRS ||  || align=right | 1.6 km || 
|-id=029 bgcolor=#E9E9E9
| 602029 ||  || — || January 23, 2014 || Mount Lemmon || Mount Lemmon Survey ||  || align=right | 1.4 km || 
|-id=030 bgcolor=#d6d6d6
| 602030 ||  || — || February 21, 2009 || Kitt Peak || Spacewatch ||  || align=right | 2.7 km || 
|-id=031 bgcolor=#fefefe
| 602031 ||  || — || February 1, 2009 || Kitt Peak || Spacewatch || H || align=right data-sort-value="0.39" | 390 m || 
|-id=032 bgcolor=#E9E9E9
| 602032 ||  || — || January 1, 2014 || Nogales || M. Schwartz, P. R. Holvorcem ||  || align=right data-sort-value="0.81" | 810 m || 
|-id=033 bgcolor=#E9E9E9
| 602033 ||  || — || January 29, 2014 || Kitt Peak || Spacewatch ||  || align=right | 2.1 km || 
|-id=034 bgcolor=#E9E9E9
| 602034 ||  || — || September 27, 2008 || Mount Lemmon || Mount Lemmon Survey ||  || align=right | 1.5 km || 
|-id=035 bgcolor=#E9E9E9
| 602035 ||  || — || August 23, 2003 || Palomar || NEAT ||  || align=right | 1.4 km || 
|-id=036 bgcolor=#d6d6d6
| 602036 ||  || — || January 29, 2014 || Kitt Peak || Spacewatch ||  || align=right | 2.6 km || 
|-id=037 bgcolor=#E9E9E9
| 602037 ||  || — || March 3, 2006 || Kitt Peak || Spacewatch ||  || align=right data-sort-value="0.86" | 860 m || 
|-id=038 bgcolor=#d6d6d6
| 602038 ||  || — || October 19, 2012 || Haleakala || Pan-STARRS ||  || align=right | 2.2 km || 
|-id=039 bgcolor=#E9E9E9
| 602039 ||  || — || October 9, 1996 || Kitt Peak || Spacewatch ||  || align=right | 1.0 km || 
|-id=040 bgcolor=#E9E9E9
| 602040 ||  || — || November 1, 2013 || Mount Lemmon || Mount Lemmon Survey ||  || align=right data-sort-value="0.76" | 760 m || 
|-id=041 bgcolor=#E9E9E9
| 602041 ||  || — || January 29, 2014 || Catalina || CSS ||  || align=right data-sort-value="0.78" | 780 m || 
|-id=042 bgcolor=#E9E9E9
| 602042 ||  || — || January 26, 2014 || Haleakala || Pan-STARRS ||  || align=right | 1.4 km || 
|-id=043 bgcolor=#d6d6d6
| 602043 ||  || — || January 31, 2014 || Haleakala || Pan-STARRS ||  || align=right | 1.9 km || 
|-id=044 bgcolor=#E9E9E9
| 602044 ||  || — || January 31, 2014 || Haleakala || Pan-STARRS ||  || align=right | 1.4 km || 
|-id=045 bgcolor=#E9E9E9
| 602045 ||  || — || December 23, 2017 || Haleakala || Pan-STARRS ||  || align=right data-sort-value="0.78" | 780 m || 
|-id=046 bgcolor=#E9E9E9
| 602046 ||  || — || January 28, 2014 || Kitt Peak || Spacewatch ||  || align=right | 2.0 km || 
|-id=047 bgcolor=#d6d6d6
| 602047 ||  || — || January 23, 2014 || Mount Lemmon || Mount Lemmon Survey ||  || align=right | 2.2 km || 
|-id=048 bgcolor=#E9E9E9
| 602048 ||  || — || February 4, 2014 || Elena Remote || A. Oreshko ||  || align=right | 1.9 km || 
|-id=049 bgcolor=#E9E9E9
| 602049 ||  || — || October 1, 2003 || Kitt Peak || Spacewatch ||  || align=right | 1.6 km || 
|-id=050 bgcolor=#E9E9E9
| 602050 ||  || — || January 9, 2014 || Mount Lemmon || Mount Lemmon Survey ||  || align=right | 1.9 km || 
|-id=051 bgcolor=#E9E9E9
| 602051 ||  || — || October 18, 2003 || Kitt Peak || Spacewatch ||  || align=right | 1.8 km || 
|-id=052 bgcolor=#E9E9E9
| 602052 ||  || — || August 18, 2012 || Charleston || R. Holmes ||  || align=right | 1.9 km || 
|-id=053 bgcolor=#fefefe
| 602053 ||  || — || February 10, 2014 || Mount Lemmon || Mount Lemmon Survey || H || align=right data-sort-value="0.77" | 770 m || 
|-id=054 bgcolor=#E9E9E9
| 602054 ||  || — || February 10, 2014 || Haleakala || Pan-STARRS ||  || align=right | 1.4 km || 
|-id=055 bgcolor=#fefefe
| 602055 ||  || — || March 11, 2003 || Palomar || NEAT || H || align=right data-sort-value="0.81" | 810 m || 
|-id=056 bgcolor=#d6d6d6
| 602056 ||  || — || December 28, 2002 || Kitt Peak || Spacewatch ||  || align=right | 2.8 km || 
|-id=057 bgcolor=#d6d6d6
| 602057 ||  || — || February 6, 2014 || Oukaimeden || C. Rinner ||  || align=right | 2.4 km || 
|-id=058 bgcolor=#fefefe
| 602058 ||  || — || July 17, 2004 || Cerro Tololo || Cerro Tololo Obs. ||  || align=right data-sort-value="0.61" | 610 m || 
|-id=059 bgcolor=#E9E9E9
| 602059 ||  || — || February 2, 2005 || Kitt Peak || Spacewatch ||  || align=right | 2.2 km || 
|-id=060 bgcolor=#E9E9E9
| 602060 ||  || — || February 10, 2014 || Haleakala || Pan-STARRS ||  || align=right | 1.7 km || 
|-id=061 bgcolor=#E9E9E9
| 602061 ||  || — || February 10, 2014 || Haleakala || Pan-STARRS ||  || align=right | 1.1 km || 
|-id=062 bgcolor=#E9E9E9
| 602062 ||  || — || February 1, 2014 || ESA OGS || ESA OGS ||  || align=right | 1.1 km || 
|-id=063 bgcolor=#E9E9E9
| 602063 ||  || — || February 9, 2014 || Kitt Peak || Spacewatch ||  || align=right | 1.0 km || 
|-id=064 bgcolor=#E9E9E9
| 602064 ||  || — || February 6, 2014 || Mount Lemmon || Mount Lemmon Survey ||  || align=right | 1.7 km || 
|-id=065 bgcolor=#E9E9E9
| 602065 ||  || — || February 9, 2005 || Mount Lemmon || Mount Lemmon Survey ||  || align=right | 1.6 km || 
|-id=066 bgcolor=#E9E9E9
| 602066 ||  || — || February 5, 2014 || Mount Lemmon || Mount Lemmon Survey ||  || align=right | 1.4 km || 
|-id=067 bgcolor=#d6d6d6
| 602067 ||  || — || February 4, 2014 || Catalina || CSS ||  || align=right | 2.4 km || 
|-id=068 bgcolor=#E9E9E9
| 602068 ||  || — || February 19, 2014 || Kitt Peak || Spacewatch ||  || align=right | 1.7 km || 
|-id=069 bgcolor=#fefefe
| 602069 ||  || — || February 6, 2014 || Catalina || CSS || H || align=right data-sort-value="0.64" | 640 m || 
|-id=070 bgcolor=#fefefe
| 602070 ||  || — || January 29, 2014 || Mount Lemmon || Mount Lemmon Survey || H || align=right data-sort-value="0.69" | 690 m || 
|-id=071 bgcolor=#d6d6d6
| 602071 ||  || — || December 5, 2007 || Catalina || CSS ||  || align=right | 3.0 km || 
|-id=072 bgcolor=#E9E9E9
| 602072 ||  || — || March 13, 2005 || Kitt Peak || Spacewatch ||  || align=right | 2.2 km || 
|-id=073 bgcolor=#d6d6d6
| 602073 ||  || — || January 29, 2014 || Oukaimeden || M. Ory ||  || align=right | 2.9 km || 
|-id=074 bgcolor=#fefefe
| 602074 ||  || — || March 11, 2003 || Palomar || NEAT ||  || align=right data-sort-value="0.74" | 740 m || 
|-id=075 bgcolor=#E9E9E9
| 602075 ||  || — || February 20, 2014 || Kitt Peak || Spacewatch ||  || align=right | 1.0 km || 
|-id=076 bgcolor=#E9E9E9
| 602076 ||  || — || January 25, 2014 || Haleakala || Pan-STARRS ||  || align=right | 1.4 km || 
|-id=077 bgcolor=#E9E9E9
| 602077 ||  || — || September 19, 1998 || Apache Point || SDSS Collaboration ||  || align=right | 2.0 km || 
|-id=078 bgcolor=#E9E9E9
| 602078 ||  || — || February 22, 2014 || Kitt Peak || Spacewatch ||  || align=right | 1.4 km || 
|-id=079 bgcolor=#E9E9E9
| 602079 ||  || — || December 25, 2013 || Mount Lemmon || Mount Lemmon Survey ||  || align=right | 1.0 km || 
|-id=080 bgcolor=#E9E9E9
| 602080 ||  || — || September 28, 2003 || Apache Point || SDSS Collaboration ||  || align=right | 1.4 km || 
|-id=081 bgcolor=#fefefe
| 602081 ||  || — || October 15, 2012 || Haleakala || Pan-STARRS ||  || align=right data-sort-value="0.70" | 700 m || 
|-id=082 bgcolor=#d6d6d6
| 602082 ||  || — || February 26, 2014 || Oukaimeden || M. Ory ||  || align=right | 3.0 km || 
|-id=083 bgcolor=#d6d6d6
| 602083 ||  || — || December 18, 2007 || Mount Lemmon || Mount Lemmon Survey ||  || align=right | 2.9 km || 
|-id=084 bgcolor=#E9E9E9
| 602084 ||  || — || January 28, 2014 || Kitt Peak || Spacewatch ||  || align=right | 1.9 km || 
|-id=085 bgcolor=#fefefe
| 602085 ||  || — || April 28, 2007 || Kitt Peak || Spacewatch ||  || align=right | 1.1 km || 
|-id=086 bgcolor=#d6d6d6
| 602086 ||  || — || February 27, 2014 || Kitt Peak || Spacewatch ||  || align=right | 2.2 km || 
|-id=087 bgcolor=#d6d6d6
| 602087 ||  || — || August 19, 2001 || Cerro Tololo || Cerro Tololo Obs. || KOR || align=right | 1.2 km || 
|-id=088 bgcolor=#C2FFFF
| 602088 ||  || — || January 10, 2013 || Haleakala || Pan-STARRS || L4 || align=right | 9.5 km || 
|-id=089 bgcolor=#d6d6d6
| 602089 ||  || — || February 7, 2008 || Kitt Peak || Spacewatch ||  || align=right | 2.2 km || 
|-id=090 bgcolor=#C2FFFF
| 602090 ||  || — || January 6, 2013 || Kitt Peak || Spacewatch || L4 || align=right | 6.0 km || 
|-id=091 bgcolor=#E9E9E9
| 602091 ||  || — || October 21, 2012 || Mount Lemmon || Mount Lemmon Survey ||  || align=right data-sort-value="0.96" | 960 m || 
|-id=092 bgcolor=#C2FFFF
| 602092 ||  || — || February 8, 2013 || Haleakala || Pan-STARRS || L4 || align=right | 6.5 km || 
|-id=093 bgcolor=#E9E9E9
| 602093 ||  || — || February 26, 2014 || Haleakala || Pan-STARRS ||  || align=right data-sort-value="0.82" | 820 m || 
|-id=094 bgcolor=#E9E9E9
| 602094 ||  || — || October 26, 2012 || Mount Lemmon || Mount Lemmon Survey ||  || align=right | 1.6 km || 
|-id=095 bgcolor=#d6d6d6
| 602095 ||  || — || February 4, 2009 || Mount Lemmon || Mount Lemmon Survey ||  || align=right | 1.8 km || 
|-id=096 bgcolor=#E9E9E9
| 602096 ||  || — || February 26, 2014 || Haleakala || Pan-STARRS ||  || align=right | 1.5 km || 
|-id=097 bgcolor=#E9E9E9
| 602097 ||  || — || October 11, 2012 || Haleakala || Pan-STARRS ||  || align=right | 1.4 km || 
|-id=098 bgcolor=#E9E9E9
| 602098 ||  || — || October 15, 2007 || Kitt Peak || Spacewatch ||  || align=right | 1.7 km || 
|-id=099 bgcolor=#E9E9E9
| 602099 ||  || — || September 11, 2007 || Mount Lemmon || Mount Lemmon Survey ||  || align=right | 1.8 km || 
|-id=100 bgcolor=#fefefe
| 602100 ||  || — || March 2, 2009 || Mount Lemmon || Mount Lemmon Survey || H || align=right data-sort-value="0.64" | 640 m || 
|}

602101–602200 

|-bgcolor=#E9E9E9
| 602101 ||  || — || November 13, 2007 || Mount Lemmon || Mount Lemmon Survey ||  || align=right | 2.0 km || 
|-id=102 bgcolor=#E9E9E9
| 602102 ||  || — || February 26, 2014 || Haleakala || Pan-STARRS ||  || align=right | 1.8 km || 
|-id=103 bgcolor=#E9E9E9
| 602103 ||  || — || September 12, 2007 || Catalina || CSS ||  || align=right | 1.8 km || 
|-id=104 bgcolor=#d6d6d6
| 602104 ||  || — || February 2, 2008 || Kitt Peak || Spacewatch || LIX || align=right | 2.4 km || 
|-id=105 bgcolor=#E9E9E9
| 602105 ||  || — || February 26, 2014 || Haleakala || Pan-STARRS ||  || align=right | 2.5 km || 
|-id=106 bgcolor=#d6d6d6
| 602106 ||  || — || August 19, 2006 || Kitt Peak || Spacewatch ||  || align=right | 2.1 km || 
|-id=107 bgcolor=#d6d6d6
| 602107 ||  || — || February 20, 2009 || Kitt Peak || Spacewatch ||  || align=right | 1.9 km || 
|-id=108 bgcolor=#E9E9E9
| 602108 ||  || — || April 12, 2005 || Kitt Peak || Kitt Peak Obs. ||  || align=right | 1.9 km || 
|-id=109 bgcolor=#d6d6d6
| 602109 ||  || — || April 5, 2003 || Kitt Peak || Spacewatch ||  || align=right | 2.4 km || 
|-id=110 bgcolor=#fefefe
| 602110 ||  || — || April 25, 2004 || Apache Point || SDSS Collaboration || H || align=right data-sort-value="0.66" | 660 m || 
|-id=111 bgcolor=#E9E9E9
| 602111 ||  || — || September 4, 2007 || Mount Lemmon || Mount Lemmon Survey ||  || align=right | 2.0 km || 
|-id=112 bgcolor=#d6d6d6
| 602112 ||  || — || September 20, 2011 || Mount Lemmon || Mount Lemmon Survey ||  || align=right | 2.8 km || 
|-id=113 bgcolor=#C2FFFF
| 602113 ||  || — || January 10, 2013 || Haleakala || Pan-STARRS || L4 || align=right | 7.0 km || 
|-id=114 bgcolor=#d6d6d6
| 602114 ||  || — || February 22, 2009 || Kitt Peak || Spacewatch ||  || align=right | 1.6 km || 
|-id=115 bgcolor=#d6d6d6
| 602115 ||  || — || February 26, 2014 || Haleakala || Pan-STARRS || 7:4 || align=right | 2.9 km || 
|-id=116 bgcolor=#E9E9E9
| 602116 ||  || — || January 1, 2014 || Mount Lemmon || Mount Lemmon Survey ||  || align=right | 1.9 km || 
|-id=117 bgcolor=#E9E9E9
| 602117 ||  || — || September 4, 2011 || Haleakala || Pan-STARRS ||  || align=right | 1.8 km || 
|-id=118 bgcolor=#E9E9E9
| 602118 ||  || — || November 12, 2012 || Mount Lemmon || Mount Lemmon Survey ||  || align=right | 1.1 km || 
|-id=119 bgcolor=#E9E9E9
| 602119 ||  || — || September 20, 2011 || Haleakala || Pan-STARRS ||  || align=right | 1.7 km || 
|-id=120 bgcolor=#E9E9E9
| 602120 ||  || — || August 10, 2007 || Kitt Peak || Spacewatch ||  || align=right | 1.8 km || 
|-id=121 bgcolor=#E9E9E9
| 602121 ||  || — || January 28, 2014 || Kitt Peak || Spacewatch ||  || align=right data-sort-value="0.85" | 850 m || 
|-id=122 bgcolor=#E9E9E9
| 602122 ||  || — || February 27, 2014 || Mount Lemmon || Mount Lemmon Survey ||  || align=right | 2.2 km || 
|-id=123 bgcolor=#E9E9E9
| 602123 ||  || — || April 20, 2010 || Mount Lemmon || Mount Lemmon Survey ||  || align=right | 1.9 km || 
|-id=124 bgcolor=#d6d6d6
| 602124 ||  || — || February 27, 2014 || Mount Lemmon || Mount Lemmon Survey ||  || align=right | 1.9 km || 
|-id=125 bgcolor=#fefefe
| 602125 ||  || — || February 27, 2014 || Mount Lemmon || Mount Lemmon Survey || H || align=right data-sort-value="0.53" | 530 m || 
|-id=126 bgcolor=#E9E9E9
| 602126 ||  || — || February 27, 2014 || Haleakala || Pan-STARRS ||  || align=right | 1.7 km || 
|-id=127 bgcolor=#E9E9E9
| 602127 ||  || — || December 1, 2004 || Catalina || CSS ||  || align=right | 1.1 km || 
|-id=128 bgcolor=#E9E9E9
| 602128 ||  || — || February 26, 2014 || Mount Lemmon || Mount Lemmon Survey ||  || align=right | 1.4 km || 
|-id=129 bgcolor=#E9E9E9
| 602129 ||  || — || February 26, 2014 || Haleakala || Pan-STARRS ||  || align=right | 1.8 km || 
|-id=130 bgcolor=#E9E9E9
| 602130 ||  || — || March 10, 2005 || Mount Lemmon || Mount Lemmon Survey ||  || align=right | 1.7 km || 
|-id=131 bgcolor=#d6d6d6
| 602131 ||  || — || February 27, 2014 || Kitt Peak || Spacewatch ||  || align=right | 2.0 km || 
|-id=132 bgcolor=#d6d6d6
| 602132 ||  || — || January 28, 2014 || Kitt Peak || Spacewatch ||  || align=right | 2.9 km || 
|-id=133 bgcolor=#C2FFFF
| 602133 ||  || — || September 26, 2009 || Kitt Peak || Spacewatch || L4 || align=right | 6.9 km || 
|-id=134 bgcolor=#C2FFFF
| 602134 ||  || — || September 25, 2008 || Mount Lemmon || Mount Lemmon Survey || L4 || align=right | 7.4 km || 
|-id=135 bgcolor=#E9E9E9
| 602135 ||  || — || January 8, 2010 || Mount Lemmon || Mount Lemmon Survey ||  || align=right | 1.4 km || 
|-id=136 bgcolor=#C2FFFF
| 602136 ||  || — || February 13, 2002 || Kitt Peak || Spacewatch || L4 || align=right | 6.8 km || 
|-id=137 bgcolor=#d6d6d6
| 602137 ||  || — || February 28, 2014 || Haleakala || Pan-STARRS ||  || align=right | 2.2 km || 
|-id=138 bgcolor=#E9E9E9
| 602138 ||  || — || September 15, 2007 || Lulin || LUSS ||  || align=right | 2.3 km || 
|-id=139 bgcolor=#E9E9E9
| 602139 ||  || — || February 28, 2014 || Haleakala || Pan-STARRS ||  || align=right | 1.6 km || 
|-id=140 bgcolor=#E9E9E9
| 602140 ||  || — || March 3, 2005 || Kitt Peak || Spacewatch ||  || align=right | 1.8 km || 
|-id=141 bgcolor=#E9E9E9
| 602141 ||  || — || December 2, 2012 || Mount Lemmon || Mount Lemmon Survey ||  || align=right | 1.3 km || 
|-id=142 bgcolor=#d6d6d6
| 602142 ||  || — || October 27, 2012 || Mount Lemmon || Mount Lemmon Survey ||  || align=right | 2.0 km || 
|-id=143 bgcolor=#E9E9E9
| 602143 ||  || — || December 4, 2012 || Mount Lemmon || Mount Lemmon Survey ||  || align=right | 2.0 km || 
|-id=144 bgcolor=#d6d6d6
| 602144 ||  || — || February 28, 2014 || Haleakala || Pan-STARRS ||  || align=right | 2.0 km || 
|-id=145 bgcolor=#C2FFFF
| 602145 ||  || — || February 2, 2013 || Mount Lemmon || Mount Lemmon Survey || L4 || align=right | 6.5 km || 
|-id=146 bgcolor=#E9E9E9
| 602146 ||  || — || December 21, 2008 || Catalina || CSS ||  || align=right | 1.5 km || 
|-id=147 bgcolor=#d6d6d6
| 602147 ||  || — || October 24, 2007 || Mount Lemmon || Mount Lemmon Survey ||  || align=right | 2.3 km || 
|-id=148 bgcolor=#E9E9E9
| 602148 ||  || — || February 9, 2014 || Haleakala || Pan-STARRS ||  || align=right | 1.6 km || 
|-id=149 bgcolor=#fefefe
| 602149 ||  || — || February 22, 2014 || Mount Lemmon || Mount Lemmon Survey || H || align=right data-sort-value="0.52" | 520 m || 
|-id=150 bgcolor=#d6d6d6
| 602150 ||  || — || March 13, 2003 || Kitt Peak || Spacewatch ||  || align=right | 1.7 km || 
|-id=151 bgcolor=#d6d6d6
| 602151 ||  || — || February 20, 2014 || Mount Lemmon || Mount Lemmon Survey ||  || align=right | 2.0 km || 
|-id=152 bgcolor=#E9E9E9
| 602152 ||  || — || September 11, 2007 || Mount Lemmon || Mount Lemmon Survey ||  || align=right | 2.0 km || 
|-id=153 bgcolor=#E9E9E9
| 602153 ||  || — || March 8, 2005 || Kitt Peak || Spacewatch ||  || align=right | 1.2 km || 
|-id=154 bgcolor=#d6d6d6
| 602154 ||  || — || December 15, 2001 || Apache Point || SDSS Collaboration ||  || align=right | 2.2 km || 
|-id=155 bgcolor=#E9E9E9
| 602155 ||  || — || February 26, 2014 || Haleakala || Pan-STARRS ||  || align=right | 1.7 km || 
|-id=156 bgcolor=#E9E9E9
| 602156 ||  || — || February 20, 2014 || Mount Lemmon || Mount Lemmon Survey ||  || align=right | 1.2 km || 
|-id=157 bgcolor=#E9E9E9
| 602157 ||  || — || February 26, 2014 || Haleakala || Pan-STARRS ||  || align=right | 1.7 km || 
|-id=158 bgcolor=#d6d6d6
| 602158 ||  || — || February 27, 2014 || Haleakala || Pan-STARRS ||  || align=right | 2.0 km || 
|-id=159 bgcolor=#E9E9E9
| 602159 ||  || — || March 19, 2015 || Haleakala || Pan-STARRS ||  || align=right | 1.3 km || 
|-id=160 bgcolor=#E9E9E9
| 602160 ||  || — || January 29, 2014 || Kitt Peak || Spacewatch ||  || align=right | 1.3 km || 
|-id=161 bgcolor=#E9E9E9
| 602161 ||  || — || February 26, 2014 || Haleakala || Pan-STARRS ||  || align=right data-sort-value="0.75" | 750 m || 
|-id=162 bgcolor=#E9E9E9
| 602162 ||  || — || June 7, 2015 || Haleakala || Pan-STARRS ||  || align=right | 1.0 km || 
|-id=163 bgcolor=#E9E9E9
| 602163 ||  || — || February 26, 2014 || Haleakala || Pan-STARRS ||  || align=right | 1.1 km || 
|-id=164 bgcolor=#E9E9E9
| 602164 ||  || — || February 26, 2014 || Haleakala || Pan-STARRS ||  || align=right | 1.7 km || 
|-id=165 bgcolor=#E9E9E9
| 602165 ||  || — || February 26, 2014 || Haleakala || Pan-STARRS ||  || align=right | 1.3 km || 
|-id=166 bgcolor=#d6d6d6
| 602166 ||  || — || February 28, 2014 || Haleakala || Pan-STARRS ||  || align=right | 1.9 km || 
|-id=167 bgcolor=#E9E9E9
| 602167 ||  || — || February 24, 2014 || Haleakala || Pan-STARRS ||  || align=right | 2.0 km || 
|-id=168 bgcolor=#E9E9E9
| 602168 ||  || — || February 20, 2014 || Mount Lemmon || Mount Lemmon Survey ||  || align=right | 1.6 km || 
|-id=169 bgcolor=#E9E9E9
| 602169 ||  || — || April 7, 2006 || Kitt Peak || Spacewatch ||  || align=right data-sort-value="0.72" | 720 m || 
|-id=170 bgcolor=#fefefe
| 602170 ||  || — || February 28, 2014 || Haleakala || Pan-STARRS ||  || align=right data-sort-value="0.54" | 540 m || 
|-id=171 bgcolor=#d6d6d6
| 602171 ||  || — || February 28, 2014 || Haleakala || Pan-STARRS ||  || align=right | 2.2 km || 
|-id=172 bgcolor=#fefefe
| 602172 ||  || — || January 23, 2014 || Mount Lemmon || Mount Lemmon Survey || H || align=right data-sort-value="0.61" | 610 m || 
|-id=173 bgcolor=#fefefe
| 602173 ||  || — || January 27, 2006 || Mount Lemmon || Mount Lemmon Survey || H || align=right data-sort-value="0.50" | 500 m || 
|-id=174 bgcolor=#E9E9E9
| 602174 ||  || — || September 27, 2008 || Mount Lemmon || Mount Lemmon Survey ||  || align=right | 1.3 km || 
|-id=175 bgcolor=#fefefe
| 602175 ||  || — || February 26, 2014 || Haleakala || Pan-STARRS || H || align=right data-sort-value="0.54" | 540 m || 
|-id=176 bgcolor=#E9E9E9
| 602176 ||  || — || September 29, 2011 || Mount Lemmon || Mount Lemmon Survey ||  || align=right | 2.2 km || 
|-id=177 bgcolor=#d6d6d6
| 602177 ||  || — || March 5, 2014 || Haleakala || Pan-STARRS ||  || align=right | 2.1 km || 
|-id=178 bgcolor=#E9E9E9
| 602178 ||  || — || August 3, 2002 || Palomar || NEAT ||  || align=right | 2.5 km || 
|-id=179 bgcolor=#E9E9E9
| 602179 ||  || — || March 6, 2014 || Mount Lemmon || Mount Lemmon Survey ||  || align=right | 1.5 km || 
|-id=180 bgcolor=#E9E9E9
| 602180 ||  || — || January 31, 2009 || Mount Lemmon || Mount Lemmon Survey ||  || align=right | 2.7 km || 
|-id=181 bgcolor=#E9E9E9
| 602181 ||  || — || November 19, 2003 || Kitt Peak || Spacewatch ||  || align=right | 1.8 km || 
|-id=182 bgcolor=#d6d6d6
| 602182 ||  || — || August 26, 2000 || Kitt Peak || Spacewatch ||  || align=right | 2.8 km || 
|-id=183 bgcolor=#E9E9E9
| 602183 ||  || — || March 5, 2014 || Haleakala || Pan-STARRS ||  || align=right | 1.4 km || 
|-id=184 bgcolor=#E9E9E9
| 602184 ||  || — || April 2, 2005 || Kitt Peak || Spacewatch ||  || align=right | 2.0 km || 
|-id=185 bgcolor=#d6d6d6
| 602185 ||  || — || March 10, 2003 || Palomar || NEAT ||  || align=right | 3.0 km || 
|-id=186 bgcolor=#E9E9E9
| 602186 ||  || — || April 2, 2005 || Mount Lemmon || Mount Lemmon Survey ||  || align=right | 1.9 km || 
|-id=187 bgcolor=#E9E9E9
| 602187 ||  || — || March 6, 2014 || Kitt Peak || Spacewatch ||  || align=right | 1.1 km || 
|-id=188 bgcolor=#E9E9E9
| 602188 ||  || — || March 6, 2014 || Mount Lemmon || Mount Lemmon Survey ||  || align=right | 2.1 km || 
|-id=189 bgcolor=#fefefe
| 602189 ||  || — || July 29, 2012 || Haleakala || Pan-STARRS || H || align=right data-sort-value="0.57" | 570 m || 
|-id=190 bgcolor=#E9E9E9
| 602190 ||  || — || February 28, 2014 || Haleakala || Pan-STARRS ||  || align=right | 1.7 km || 
|-id=191 bgcolor=#d6d6d6
| 602191 ||  || — || October 23, 2006 || Palomar || NEAT ||  || align=right | 3.9 km || 
|-id=192 bgcolor=#d6d6d6
| 602192 ||  || — || March 6, 2014 || Mount Lemmon || Mount Lemmon Survey ||  || align=right | 2.3 km || 
|-id=193 bgcolor=#d6d6d6
| 602193 ||  || — || February 26, 2014 || Haleakala || Pan-STARRS ||  || align=right | 2.0 km || 
|-id=194 bgcolor=#C2FFFF
| 602194 ||  || — || December 25, 2010 || Mount Lemmon || Mount Lemmon Survey || L4ERY || align=right | 8.1 km || 
|-id=195 bgcolor=#d6d6d6
| 602195 ||  || — || December 17, 2007 || Kitt Peak || Spacewatch ||  || align=right | 2.7 km || 
|-id=196 bgcolor=#E9E9E9
| 602196 ||  || — || March 8, 2014 || Mount Lemmon || Mount Lemmon Survey ||  || align=right | 1.2 km || 
|-id=197 bgcolor=#E9E9E9
| 602197 ||  || — || October 20, 2003 || Kitt Peak || Spacewatch ||  || align=right | 1.5 km || 
|-id=198 bgcolor=#E9E9E9
| 602198 ||  || — || March 8, 2014 || Mount Lemmon || Mount Lemmon Survey ||  || align=right | 1.6 km || 
|-id=199 bgcolor=#E9E9E9
| 602199 ||  || — || December 30, 2008 || Mount Lemmon || Mount Lemmon Survey ||  || align=right | 1.5 km || 
|-id=200 bgcolor=#E9E9E9
| 602200 ||  || — || January 19, 2001 || Kitt Peak || Spacewatch ||  || align=right | 1.4 km || 
|}

602201–602300 

|-bgcolor=#E9E9E9
| 602201 ||  || — || November 26, 2000 || Socorro || LINEAR ||  || align=right | 1.1 km || 
|-id=202 bgcolor=#E9E9E9
| 602202 ||  || — || April 11, 2010 || Mount Lemmon || Mount Lemmon Survey ||  || align=right | 1.2 km || 
|-id=203 bgcolor=#E9E9E9
| 602203 ||  || — || February 26, 2014 || Haleakala || Pan-STARRS ||  || align=right | 1.9 km || 
|-id=204 bgcolor=#E9E9E9
| 602204 ||  || — || January 18, 2009 || Mount Lemmon || Mount Lemmon Survey ||  || align=right | 1.8 km || 
|-id=205 bgcolor=#E9E9E9
| 602205 ||  || — || March 11, 2014 || Mount Lemmon || Mount Lemmon Survey ||  || align=right | 1.0 km || 
|-id=206 bgcolor=#E9E9E9
| 602206 ||  || — || March 8, 2014 || Catalina || CSS ||  || align=right | 2.0 km || 
|-id=207 bgcolor=#E9E9E9
| 602207 ||  || — || October 18, 2012 || Haleakala || Pan-STARRS ||  || align=right | 1.3 km || 
|-id=208 bgcolor=#E9E9E9
| 602208 ||  || — || May 14, 2015 || Haleakala || Pan-STARRS ||  || align=right | 1.2 km || 
|-id=209 bgcolor=#E9E9E9
| 602209 ||  || — || February 28, 2014 || Haleakala || Pan-STARRS ||  || align=right | 1.3 km || 
|-id=210 bgcolor=#C2FFFF
| 602210 ||  || — || September 20, 2008 || Mount Lemmon || Mount Lemmon Survey || L4 || align=right | 6.8 km || 
|-id=211 bgcolor=#C2FFFF
| 602211 ||  || — || September 6, 2008 || Kitt Peak || Spacewatch || L4 || align=right | 7.1 km || 
|-id=212 bgcolor=#E9E9E9
| 602212 ||  || — || May 26, 2015 || Mount Lemmon || Mount Lemmon Survey ||  || align=right data-sort-value="0.78" | 780 m || 
|-id=213 bgcolor=#d6d6d6
| 602213 ||  || — || August 29, 2016 || Mount Lemmon || Mount Lemmon Survey ||  || align=right | 2.2 km || 
|-id=214 bgcolor=#E9E9E9
| 602214 ||  || — || January 18, 2009 || Kitt Peak || Spacewatch ||  || align=right | 1.6 km || 
|-id=215 bgcolor=#C2FFFF
| 602215 ||  || — || September 3, 2008 || Kitt Peak || Spacewatch || L4 || align=right | 6.9 km || 
|-id=216 bgcolor=#E9E9E9
| 602216 ||  || — || November 5, 2016 || Haleakala || Pan-STARRS ||  || align=right data-sort-value="0.70" | 700 m || 
|-id=217 bgcolor=#fefefe
| 602217 ||  || — || February 28, 2014 || Haleakala || Pan-STARRS ||  || align=right data-sort-value="0.58" | 580 m || 
|-id=218 bgcolor=#E9E9E9
| 602218 ||  || — || October 26, 2016 || Mount Lemmon || Mount Lemmon Survey ||  || align=right data-sort-value="0.95" | 950 m || 
|-id=219 bgcolor=#C2FFFF
| 602219 ||  || — || September 5, 2010 || Mount Lemmon || Mount Lemmon Survey || L4 || align=right | 5.6 km || 
|-id=220 bgcolor=#E9E9E9
| 602220 ||  || — || February 26, 2014 || Haleakala || Pan-STARRS ||  || align=right | 1.1 km || 
|-id=221 bgcolor=#E9E9E9
| 602221 ||  || — || September 5, 2007 || Mount Lemmon || Mount Lemmon Survey ||  || align=right | 1.5 km || 
|-id=222 bgcolor=#E9E9E9
| 602222 ||  || — || June 16, 2015 || Haleakala || Pan-STARRS ||  || align=right | 1.4 km || 
|-id=223 bgcolor=#fefefe
| 602223 ||  || — || August 8, 2012 || Haleakala || Pan-STARRS ||  || align=right data-sort-value="0.72" | 720 m || 
|-id=224 bgcolor=#C2FFFF
| 602224 ||  || — || January 5, 2013 || Kitt Peak || Spacewatch || L4 || align=right | 7.0 km || 
|-id=225 bgcolor=#E9E9E9
| 602225 ||  || — || September 18, 2003 || Kitt Peak || Spacewatch ||  || align=right | 1.2 km || 
|-id=226 bgcolor=#d6d6d6
| 602226 ||  || — || February 26, 2004 || Kitt Peak || M. W. Buie, D. E. Trilling ||  || align=right | 1.7 km || 
|-id=227 bgcolor=#C2FFFF
| 602227 ||  || — || June 23, 2017 || Haleakala || Pan-STARRS || L4 || align=right | 5.9 km || 
|-id=228 bgcolor=#E9E9E9
| 602228 ||  || — || September 14, 2007 || Mount Lemmon || Mount Lemmon Survey ||  || align=right | 1.6 km || 
|-id=229 bgcolor=#E9E9E9
| 602229 ||  || — || August 23, 2003 || Palomar || NEAT ||  || align=right | 1.1 km || 
|-id=230 bgcolor=#E9E9E9
| 602230 ||  || — || November 13, 2012 || Mount Lemmon || Mount Lemmon Survey ||  || align=right | 1.1 km || 
|-id=231 bgcolor=#E9E9E9
| 602231 ||  || — || October 10, 2016 || Haleakala || Pan-STARRS ||  || align=right data-sort-value="0.80" | 800 m || 
|-id=232 bgcolor=#C2FFFF
| 602232 ||  || — || November 15, 2010 || Kitt Peak || Spacewatch || L4 || align=right | 10 km || 
|-id=233 bgcolor=#E9E9E9
| 602233 ||  || — || August 30, 2016 || Mount Lemmon || Mount Lemmon Survey ||  || align=right data-sort-value="0.98" | 980 m || 
|-id=234 bgcolor=#E9E9E9
| 602234 ||  || — || February 5, 2009 || Kitt Peak || Spacewatch ||  || align=right | 1.6 km || 
|-id=235 bgcolor=#E9E9E9
| 602235 ||  || — || October 26, 2016 || Haleakala || Pan-STARRS ||  || align=right | 1.5 km || 
|-id=236 bgcolor=#d6d6d6
| 602236 ||  || — || July 9, 2016 || Haleakala || Pan-STARRS ||  || align=right | 1.9 km || 
|-id=237 bgcolor=#E9E9E9
| 602237 ||  || — || January 25, 2009 || Kitt Peak || Spacewatch ||  || align=right | 1.8 km || 
|-id=238 bgcolor=#C2FFFF
| 602238 ||  || — || September 5, 2008 || Kitt Peak || Spacewatch || L4 || align=right | 8.1 km || 
|-id=239 bgcolor=#C2FFFF
| 602239 ||  || — || August 24, 2008 || Kitt Peak || Spacewatch || L4 || align=right | 7.1 km || 
|-id=240 bgcolor=#E9E9E9
| 602240 ||  || — || September 4, 2007 || Catalina || CSS ||  || align=right | 1.3 km || 
|-id=241 bgcolor=#E9E9E9
| 602241 ||  || — || October 12, 2016 || Haleakala || Pan-STARRS ||  || align=right | 1.2 km || 
|-id=242 bgcolor=#E9E9E9
| 602242 ||  || — || October 9, 2016 || Mount Lemmon || Mount Lemmon Survey ||  || align=right | 1.7 km || 
|-id=243 bgcolor=#E9E9E9
| 602243 ||  || — || September 20, 2007 || Kitt Peak || Spacewatch ||  || align=right | 1.5 km || 
|-id=244 bgcolor=#E9E9E9
| 602244 ||  || — || November 13, 2017 || Haleakala || Pan-STARRS ||  || align=right | 1.8 km || 
|-id=245 bgcolor=#d6d6d6
| 602245 ||  || — || September 18, 2006 || Kitt Peak || Spacewatch ||  || align=right | 2.5 km || 
|-id=246 bgcolor=#d6d6d6
| 602246 ||  || — || February 28, 2014 || Haleakala || Pan-STARRS ||  || align=right | 2.0 km || 
|-id=247 bgcolor=#C2FFFF
| 602247 ||  || — || September 5, 2007 || Mount Lemmon || Mount Lemmon Survey || L4 || align=right | 8.6 km || 
|-id=248 bgcolor=#d6d6d6
| 602248 ||  || — || October 21, 2012 || Mount Lemmon || Mount Lemmon Survey ||  || align=right | 2.2 km || 
|-id=249 bgcolor=#E9E9E9
| 602249 ||  || — || July 11, 2016 || Haleakala || Pan-STARRS ||  || align=right | 1.2 km || 
|-id=250 bgcolor=#C2FFFF
| 602250 ||  || — || September 5, 2008 || Kitt Peak || Spacewatch || L4 || align=right | 6.1 km || 
|-id=251 bgcolor=#d6d6d6
| 602251 ||  || — || January 13, 2008 || Kitt Peak || Spacewatch ||  || align=right | 2.4 km || 
|-id=252 bgcolor=#d6d6d6
| 602252 ||  || — || September 20, 2006 || Kitt Peak || Spacewatch ||  || align=right | 2.1 km || 
|-id=253 bgcolor=#d6d6d6
| 602253 ||  || — || June 7, 2016 || Haleakala || Pan-STARRS ||  || align=right | 2.4 km || 
|-id=254 bgcolor=#C2FFFF
| 602254 ||  || — || December 28, 2011 || Mount Lemmon || Mount Lemmon Survey || L4 || align=right | 7.4 km || 
|-id=255 bgcolor=#E9E9E9
| 602255 ||  || — || October 22, 2003 || Apache Point || SDSS Collaboration ||  || align=right | 1.5 km || 
|-id=256 bgcolor=#E9E9E9
| 602256 ||  || — || October 8, 2012 || Haleakala || Pan-STARRS ||  || align=right | 1.3 km || 
|-id=257 bgcolor=#E9E9E9
| 602257 ||  || — || January 29, 2014 || Catalina || CSS ||  || align=right | 1.8 km || 
|-id=258 bgcolor=#C2FFFF
| 602258 ||  || — || March 6, 2014 || Mount Lemmon || Mount Lemmon Survey || L4 || align=right | 6.9 km || 
|-id=259 bgcolor=#FA8072
| 602259 ||  || — || March 18, 2014 || Haleakala || Pan-STARRS || H || align=right data-sort-value="0.57" | 570 m || 
|-id=260 bgcolor=#E9E9E9
| 602260 ||  || — || April 20, 2010 || Mount Lemmon || Mount Lemmon Survey ||  || align=right | 1.3 km || 
|-id=261 bgcolor=#C2FFFF
| 602261 ||  || — || April 1, 2003 || Apache Point || SDSS Collaboration || L4 || align=right | 6.6 km || 
|-id=262 bgcolor=#d6d6d6
| 602262 ||  || — || March 20, 2014 || Mount Lemmon || Mount Lemmon Survey ||  || align=right | 2.0 km || 
|-id=263 bgcolor=#C2FFFF
| 602263 ||  || — || October 16, 2010 || Charleston || R. Holmes || L4 || align=right | 8.7 km || 
|-id=264 bgcolor=#d6d6d6
| 602264 ||  || — || November 12, 2001 || Apache Point || SDSS Collaboration ||  || align=right | 2.1 km || 
|-id=265 bgcolor=#fefefe
| 602265 ||  || — || February 25, 2014 || Haleakala || Pan-STARRS || H || align=right data-sort-value="0.60" | 600 m || 
|-id=266 bgcolor=#fefefe
| 602266 ||  || — || February 24, 2006 || Kitt Peak || Spacewatch || H || align=right data-sort-value="0.49" | 490 m || 
|-id=267 bgcolor=#d6d6d6
| 602267 ||  || — || March 5, 2008 || Vail-Jarnac || Jarnac Obs. ||  || align=right | 3.0 km || 
|-id=268 bgcolor=#fefefe
| 602268 ||  || — || February 16, 2010 || Mount Lemmon || Mount Lemmon Survey ||  || align=right data-sort-value="0.56" | 560 m || 
|-id=269 bgcolor=#E9E9E9
| 602269 ||  || — || February 27, 2014 || Kitt Peak || Spacewatch ||  || align=right | 1.6 km || 
|-id=270 bgcolor=#E9E9E9
| 602270 ||  || — || March 17, 2005 || Mount Lemmon || Mount Lemmon Survey ||  || align=right | 2.1 km || 
|-id=271 bgcolor=#E9E9E9
| 602271 ||  || — || October 11, 2007 || Mount Lemmon || Mount Lemmon Survey ||  || align=right | 1.6 km || 
|-id=272 bgcolor=#E9E9E9
| 602272 ||  || — || September 21, 2011 || Mount Lemmon || Mount Lemmon Survey ||  || align=right | 1.2 km || 
|-id=273 bgcolor=#d6d6d6
| 602273 ||  || — || November 13, 2012 || Mount Lemmon || Mount Lemmon Survey ||  || align=right | 3.2 km || 
|-id=274 bgcolor=#E9E9E9
| 602274 ||  || — || January 28, 2014 || Kitt Peak || Spacewatch ||  || align=right data-sort-value="0.85" | 850 m || 
|-id=275 bgcolor=#fefefe
| 602275 ||  || — || February 10, 2014 || Haleakala || Pan-STARRS || H || align=right data-sort-value="0.54" | 540 m || 
|-id=276 bgcolor=#E9E9E9
| 602276 ||  || — || October 7, 2007 || Mount Lemmon || Mount Lemmon Survey ||  || align=right | 1.4 km || 
|-id=277 bgcolor=#E9E9E9
| 602277 ||  || — || March 10, 2005 || Mount Lemmon || Mount Lemmon Survey ||  || align=right | 2.2 km || 
|-id=278 bgcolor=#d6d6d6
| 602278 ||  || — || March 12, 2014 || Mount Lemmon || Mount Lemmon Survey ||  || align=right | 2.0 km || 
|-id=279 bgcolor=#d6d6d6
| 602279 ||  || — || March 23, 2014 || Mount Lemmon || Mount Lemmon Survey ||  || align=right | 2.5 km || 
|-id=280 bgcolor=#d6d6d6
| 602280 ||  || — || February 9, 2014 || Haleakala || Pan-STARRS || EOS || align=right | 1.8 km || 
|-id=281 bgcolor=#d6d6d6
| 602281 ||  || — || March 19, 2009 || Bergisch Gladbach || W. Bickel ||  || align=right | 2.4 km || 
|-id=282 bgcolor=#FA8072
| 602282 ||  || — || July 29, 2012 || Haleakala || Pan-STARRS || H || align=right data-sort-value="0.66" | 660 m || 
|-id=283 bgcolor=#C2FFFF
| 602283 ||  || — || November 22, 2011 || Mount Lemmon || Mount Lemmon Survey || L4 || align=right | 7.8 km || 
|-id=284 bgcolor=#E9E9E9
| 602284 ||  || — || November 19, 2003 || Kitt Peak || Spacewatch ||  || align=right | 1.9 km || 
|-id=285 bgcolor=#FA8072
| 602285 ||  || — || March 29, 2014 || Mount Lemmon || Mount Lemmon Survey || H || align=right data-sort-value="0.42" | 420 m || 
|-id=286 bgcolor=#fefefe
| 602286 ||  || — || September 13, 2007 || Mount Lemmon || Mount Lemmon Survey || H || align=right data-sort-value="0.54" | 540 m || 
|-id=287 bgcolor=#E9E9E9
| 602287 ||  || — || October 22, 2012 || Haleakala || Pan-STARRS ||  || align=right | 2.7 km || 
|-id=288 bgcolor=#d6d6d6
| 602288 ||  || — || March 27, 2014 || Haleakala || Pan-STARRS ||  || align=right | 2.0 km || 
|-id=289 bgcolor=#d6d6d6
| 602289 ||  || — || January 30, 2003 || Kitt Peak || Spacewatch ||  || align=right | 2.0 km || 
|-id=290 bgcolor=#E9E9E9
| 602290 ||  || — || February 24, 2014 || Haleakala || Pan-STARRS ||  || align=right | 1.8 km || 
|-id=291 bgcolor=#E9E9E9
| 602291 ||  || — || August 21, 2006 || Cerro Tololo || L. H. Wasserman ||  || align=right | 1.9 km || 
|-id=292 bgcolor=#d6d6d6
| 602292 ||  || — || March 28, 2014 || Mount Lemmon || Mount Lemmon Survey ||  || align=right | 1.9 km || 
|-id=293 bgcolor=#E9E9E9
| 602293 ||  || — || January 29, 2009 || Kitt Peak || Spacewatch ||  || align=right | 1.5 km || 
|-id=294 bgcolor=#d6d6d6
| 602294 ||  || — || March 1, 2008 || Kitt Peak || Spacewatch || Tj (2.98) || align=right | 2.8 km || 
|-id=295 bgcolor=#fefefe
| 602295 ||  || — || October 9, 2007 || Kitt Peak || Spacewatch || H || align=right data-sort-value="0.58" | 580 m || 
|-id=296 bgcolor=#fefefe
| 602296 ||  || — || March 24, 2014 || Haleakala || Pan-STARRS || H || align=right data-sort-value="0.57" | 570 m || 
|-id=297 bgcolor=#d6d6d6
| 602297 ||  || — || March 25, 2014 || Kitt Peak || Spacewatch ||  || align=right | 2.4 km || 
|-id=298 bgcolor=#d6d6d6
| 602298 ||  || — || March 24, 2014 || Haleakala || Pan-STARRS ||  || align=right | 1.9 km || 
|-id=299 bgcolor=#E9E9E9
| 602299 ||  || — || March 27, 2014 || Mount Lemmon || Mount Lemmon Survey ||  || align=right | 1.5 km || 
|-id=300 bgcolor=#E9E9E9
| 602300 ||  || — || June 18, 2015 || Haleakala || Pan-STARRS ||  || align=right | 1.4 km || 
|}

602301–602400 

|-bgcolor=#E9E9E9
| 602301 ||  || — || March 31, 2014 || Kitt Peak || Spacewatch ||  || align=right | 2.3 km || 
|-id=302 bgcolor=#d6d6d6
| 602302 ||  || — || March 31, 2014 || Mount Lemmon || Mount Lemmon Survey ||  || align=right | 1.6 km || 
|-id=303 bgcolor=#E9E9E9
| 602303 ||  || — || March 10, 2014 || Kitt Peak || Spacewatch ||  || align=right | 1.6 km || 
|-id=304 bgcolor=#E9E9E9
| 602304 ||  || — || February 26, 2014 || Haleakala || Pan-STARRS ||  || align=right | 1.8 km || 
|-id=305 bgcolor=#E9E9E9
| 602305 ||  || — || February 26, 2014 || Haleakala || Pan-STARRS ||  || align=right | 1.4 km || 
|-id=306 bgcolor=#d6d6d6
| 602306 ||  || — || March 8, 2014 || Kitt Peak || Spacewatch ||  || align=right | 2.2 km || 
|-id=307 bgcolor=#E9E9E9
| 602307 ||  || — || February 22, 2014 || Mount Lemmon || Mount Lemmon Survey ||  || align=right | 1.4 km || 
|-id=308 bgcolor=#d6d6d6
| 602308 ||  || — || April 3, 2014 || XuYi || PMO NEO ||  || align=right | 2.9 km || 
|-id=309 bgcolor=#E9E9E9
| 602309 ||  || — || November 8, 2007 || Kitt Peak || Spacewatch ||  || align=right | 2.6 km || 
|-id=310 bgcolor=#d6d6d6
| 602310 ||  || — || April 20, 2009 || Mount Lemmon || Mount Lemmon Survey ||  || align=right | 2.3 km || 
|-id=311 bgcolor=#E9E9E9
| 602311 ||  || — || April 4, 2014 || Mount Lemmon || Mount Lemmon Survey ||  || align=right | 2.0 km || 
|-id=312 bgcolor=#d6d6d6
| 602312 ||  || — || October 1, 2005 || Catalina || CSS ||  || align=right | 3.1 km || 
|-id=313 bgcolor=#E9E9E9
| 602313 ||  || — || January 26, 2009 || Bergisch Gladbach || W. Bickel ||  || align=right | 1.9 km || 
|-id=314 bgcolor=#E9E9E9
| 602314 ||  || — || November 19, 2012 || Kitt Peak || Spacewatch ||  || align=right | 1.6 km || 
|-id=315 bgcolor=#d6d6d6
| 602315 ||  || — || April 1, 2014 || XuYi || PMO NEO ||  || align=right | 2.7 km || 
|-id=316 bgcolor=#E9E9E9
| 602316 ||  || — || January 17, 2004 || Palomar || NEAT ||  || align=right | 3.4 km || 
|-id=317 bgcolor=#d6d6d6
| 602317 ||  || — || August 27, 2005 || Kitt Peak || Spacewatch || EOS || align=right | 2.1 km || 
|-id=318 bgcolor=#fefefe
| 602318 ||  || — || February 24, 2006 || Palomar || NEAT || H || align=right data-sort-value="0.85" | 850 m || 
|-id=319 bgcolor=#fefefe
| 602319 ||  || — || October 29, 2005 || Palomar || NEAT || H || align=right data-sort-value="0.71" | 710 m || 
|-id=320 bgcolor=#d6d6d6
| 602320 ||  || — || April 6, 2014 || Catalina || CSS ||  || align=right | 3.1 km || 
|-id=321 bgcolor=#C2FFFF
| 602321 ||  || — || March 8, 2014 || Mount Lemmon || Mount Lemmon Survey || L4 || align=right | 7.6 km || 
|-id=322 bgcolor=#E9E9E9
| 602322 ||  || — || October 27, 2008 || Mount Lemmon || Mount Lemmon Survey ||  || align=right | 1.3 km || 
|-id=323 bgcolor=#C2FFFF
| 602323 ||  || — || November 12, 2010 || Mount Lemmon || Mount Lemmon Survey || L4 || align=right | 7.5 km || 
|-id=324 bgcolor=#d6d6d6
| 602324 ||  || — || April 5, 2014 || Haleakala || Pan-STARRS ||  || align=right | 1.9 km || 
|-id=325 bgcolor=#d6d6d6
| 602325 ||  || — || April 6, 2014 || Mount Lemmon || Mount Lemmon Survey ||  || align=right | 1.9 km || 
|-id=326 bgcolor=#d6d6d6
| 602326 ||  || — || April 5, 2014 || Haleakala || Pan-STARRS ||  || align=right | 1.5 km || 
|-id=327 bgcolor=#d6d6d6
| 602327 ||  || — || April 5, 2014 || Haleakala || Pan-STARRS ||  || align=right | 1.9 km || 
|-id=328 bgcolor=#d6d6d6
| 602328 ||  || — || April 1, 2014 || Mount Lemmon || Mount Lemmon Survey ||  || align=right | 1.6 km || 
|-id=329 bgcolor=#E9E9E9
| 602329 ||  || — || April 5, 2014 || Haleakala || Pan-STARRS ||  || align=right | 1.9 km || 
|-id=330 bgcolor=#FA8072
| 602330 ||  || — || November 6, 2002 || Palomar || NEAT || H || align=right data-sort-value="0.70" | 700 m || 
|-id=331 bgcolor=#E9E9E9
| 602331 ||  || — || November 16, 2007 || Mount Lemmon || Mount Lemmon Survey ||  || align=right | 2.4 km || 
|-id=332 bgcolor=#d6d6d6
| 602332 ||  || — || February 10, 2014 || Haleakala || Pan-STARRS ||  || align=right | 2.8 km || 
|-id=333 bgcolor=#E9E9E9
| 602333 ||  || — || March 1, 2009 || Catalina || CSS ||  || align=right | 2.1 km || 
|-id=334 bgcolor=#d6d6d6
| 602334 ||  || — || April 5, 2014 || Haleakala || Pan-STARRS ||  || align=right | 1.7 km || 
|-id=335 bgcolor=#E9E9E9
| 602335 ||  || — || April 5, 2014 || Haleakala || Pan-STARRS ||  || align=right | 1.8 km || 
|-id=336 bgcolor=#d6d6d6
| 602336 ||  || — || April 5, 2014 || Haleakala || Pan-STARRS ||  || align=right | 1.6 km || 
|-id=337 bgcolor=#d6d6d6
| 602337 ||  || — || August 10, 2010 || Kitt Peak || Spacewatch ||  || align=right | 2.3 km || 
|-id=338 bgcolor=#d6d6d6
| 602338 ||  || — || November 15, 2011 || Mount Lemmon || Mount Lemmon Survey ||  || align=right | 2.7 km || 
|-id=339 bgcolor=#d6d6d6
| 602339 ||  || — || April 15, 2008 || Mount Lemmon || Mount Lemmon Survey ||  || align=right | 1.7 km || 
|-id=340 bgcolor=#E9E9E9
| 602340 ||  || — || September 27, 2003 || Kitt Peak || Spacewatch ||  || align=right | 1.7 km || 
|-id=341 bgcolor=#d6d6d6
| 602341 ||  || — || September 9, 2004 || Kitt Peak || Spacewatch ||  || align=right | 1.9 km || 
|-id=342 bgcolor=#d6d6d6
| 602342 ||  || — || September 10, 2007 || Kitt Peak || Spacewatch ||  || align=right | 2.4 km || 
|-id=343 bgcolor=#d6d6d6
| 602343 ||  || — || April 2, 2014 || Kitt Peak || Spacewatch ||  || align=right | 1.9 km || 
|-id=344 bgcolor=#E9E9E9
| 602344 ||  || — || September 15, 2006 || Kitt Peak || Spacewatch ||  || align=right | 1.8 km || 
|-id=345 bgcolor=#d6d6d6
| 602345 ||  || — || September 25, 2011 || Haleakala || Pan-STARRS ||  || align=right | 2.3 km || 
|-id=346 bgcolor=#E9E9E9
| 602346 ||  || — || April 7, 2005 || Kitt Peak || Spacewatch ||  || align=right | 1.8 km || 
|-id=347 bgcolor=#fefefe
| 602347 ||  || — || January 9, 2006 || Kitt Peak || Spacewatch ||  || align=right data-sort-value="0.54" | 540 m || 
|-id=348 bgcolor=#d6d6d6
| 602348 ||  || — || March 27, 2014 || Haleakala || Pan-STARRS ||  || align=right | 1.8 km || 
|-id=349 bgcolor=#d6d6d6
| 602349 ||  || — || April 23, 2014 || Cerro Tololo-DECam || CTIO-DECam ||  || align=right | 2.3 km || 
|-id=350 bgcolor=#E9E9E9
| 602350 ||  || — || April 20, 2014 || Mount Lemmon || Mount Lemmon Survey ||  || align=right | 1.3 km || 
|-id=351 bgcolor=#d6d6d6
| 602351 ||  || — || December 23, 2012 || Haleakala || Pan-STARRS ||  || align=right | 1.7 km || 
|-id=352 bgcolor=#E9E9E9
| 602352 ||  || — || April 23, 2014 || Cerro Tololo-DECam || CTIO-DECam ||  || align=right | 1.6 km || 
|-id=353 bgcolor=#d6d6d6
| 602353 ||  || — || January 5, 2013 || Kitt Peak || Spacewatch || KOR || align=right | 1.1 km || 
|-id=354 bgcolor=#d6d6d6
| 602354 ||  || — || October 28, 2011 || Ka-Dar || V. Gerke ||  || align=right | 2.3 km || 
|-id=355 bgcolor=#E9E9E9
| 602355 ||  || — || April 23, 2014 || Cerro Tololo-DECam || CTIO-DECam ||  || align=right | 1.8 km || 
|-id=356 bgcolor=#fefefe
| 602356 ||  || — || October 27, 2008 || Mount Lemmon || Mount Lemmon Survey ||  || align=right data-sort-value="0.68" | 680 m || 
|-id=357 bgcolor=#d6d6d6
| 602357 ||  || — || April 24, 2014 || Mount Lemmon || Mount Lemmon Survey ||  || align=right | 1.9 km || 
|-id=358 bgcolor=#E9E9E9
| 602358 ||  || — || April 23, 2014 || Cerro Tololo-DECam || CTIO-DECam ||  || align=right | 1.5 km || 
|-id=359 bgcolor=#d6d6d6
| 602359 ||  || — || February 9, 2008 || Kitt Peak || Spacewatch ||  || align=right | 2.0 km || 
|-id=360 bgcolor=#E9E9E9
| 602360 ||  || — || October 20, 2007 || Mount Lemmon || Mount Lemmon Survey ||  || align=right | 1.6 km || 
|-id=361 bgcolor=#d6d6d6
| 602361 ||  || — || October 24, 2011 || Haleakala || Pan-STARRS ||  || align=right | 2.2 km || 
|-id=362 bgcolor=#E9E9E9
| 602362 ||  || — || December 13, 2012 || Mount Lemmon || Mount Lemmon Survey ||  || align=right | 1.2 km || 
|-id=363 bgcolor=#C2FFFF
| 602363 ||  || — || September 29, 2008 || Mount Lemmon || Mount Lemmon Survey || L4 || align=right | 8.9 km || 
|-id=364 bgcolor=#d6d6d6
| 602364 ||  || — || October 26, 2011 || Haleakala || Pan-STARRS ||  || align=right | 1.9 km || 
|-id=365 bgcolor=#d6d6d6
| 602365 ||  || — || February 9, 2013 || Haleakala || Pan-STARRS ||  || align=right | 1.9 km || 
|-id=366 bgcolor=#d6d6d6
| 602366 ||  || — || October 6, 2005 || Kitt Peak || Spacewatch ||  || align=right | 2.4 km || 
|-id=367 bgcolor=#d6d6d6
| 602367 ||  || — || November 11, 2001 || Apache Point || SDSS Collaboration ||  || align=right | 2.1 km || 
|-id=368 bgcolor=#d6d6d6
| 602368 ||  || — || March 28, 2014 || Haleakala || Pan-STARRS ||  || align=right | 2.2 km || 
|-id=369 bgcolor=#E9E9E9
| 602369 ||  || — || April 5, 2014 || Haleakala || Pan-STARRS ||  || align=right | 1.7 km || 
|-id=370 bgcolor=#d6d6d6
| 602370 ||  || — || April 7, 2014 || Mount Lemmon || Mount Lemmon Survey ||  || align=right | 2.0 km || 
|-id=371 bgcolor=#d6d6d6
| 602371 ||  || — || February 10, 2008 || Kitt Peak || Spacewatch ||  || align=right | 2.2 km || 
|-id=372 bgcolor=#d6d6d6
| 602372 ||  || — || April 29, 2014 || Haleakala || Pan-STARRS ||  || align=right | 2.4 km || 
|-id=373 bgcolor=#E9E9E9
| 602373 ||  || — || February 28, 2014 || Haleakala || Pan-STARRS ||  || align=right data-sort-value="0.95" | 950 m || 
|-id=374 bgcolor=#d6d6d6
| 602374 ||  || — || February 28, 2014 || Haleakala || Pan-STARRS ||  || align=right | 2.0 km || 
|-id=375 bgcolor=#E9E9E9
| 602375 ||  || — || April 30, 2014 || Haleakala || Pan-STARRS ||  || align=right | 1.1 km || 
|-id=376 bgcolor=#d6d6d6
| 602376 ||  || — || April 2, 2014 || Kitt Peak || Spacewatch || Tj (2.99) || align=right | 2.7 km || 
|-id=377 bgcolor=#d6d6d6
| 602377 ||  || — || March 19, 2009 || Kitt Peak || Spacewatch ||  || align=right | 2.0 km || 
|-id=378 bgcolor=#d6d6d6
| 602378 ||  || — || October 27, 2011 || Mount Lemmon || Mount Lemmon Survey ||  || align=right | 2.4 km || 
|-id=379 bgcolor=#d6d6d6
| 602379 ||  || — || June 29, 2015 || Haleakala || Pan-STARRS ||  || align=right | 1.6 km || 
|-id=380 bgcolor=#d6d6d6
| 602380 ||  || — || April 30, 2014 || Haleakala || Pan-STARRS ||  || align=right | 4.2 km || 
|-id=381 bgcolor=#d6d6d6
| 602381 ||  || — || April 24, 2014 || Haleakala || Pan-STARRS ||  || align=right | 2.0 km || 
|-id=382 bgcolor=#d6d6d6
| 602382 ||  || — || April 21, 2014 || Kitt Peak || Spacewatch ||  || align=right | 1.8 km || 
|-id=383 bgcolor=#E9E9E9
| 602383 ||  || — || April 29, 2014 || Oukaimeden || C. Rinner ||  || align=right | 1.6 km || 
|-id=384 bgcolor=#d6d6d6
| 602384 ||  || — || January 7, 2013 || Mount Lemmon || Mount Lemmon Survey ||  || align=right | 2.2 km || 
|-id=385 bgcolor=#d6d6d6
| 602385 ||  || — || April 29, 2014 || Haleakala || Pan-STARRS ||  || align=right | 2.1 km || 
|-id=386 bgcolor=#d6d6d6
| 602386 ||  || — || April 30, 2014 || Haleakala || Pan-STARRS ||  || align=right | 2.1 km || 
|-id=387 bgcolor=#d6d6d6
| 602387 ||  || — || April 24, 2014 || Haleakala || Pan-STARRS ||  || align=right | 2.2 km || 
|-id=388 bgcolor=#d6d6d6
| 602388 ||  || — || April 25, 2014 || Mount Lemmon || Mount Lemmon Survey ||  || align=right | 1.6 km || 
|-id=389 bgcolor=#d6d6d6
| 602389 ||  || — || February 28, 2008 || Kitt Peak || Spacewatch ||  || align=right | 1.9 km || 
|-id=390 bgcolor=#d6d6d6
| 602390 ||  || — || April 30, 2014 || Haleakala || Pan-STARRS ||  || align=right | 1.7 km || 
|-id=391 bgcolor=#d6d6d6
| 602391 ||  || — || April 30, 2014 || Haleakala || Pan-STARRS ||  || align=right | 1.9 km || 
|-id=392 bgcolor=#d6d6d6
| 602392 ||  || — || April 29, 2014 || Haleakala || Pan-STARRS ||  || align=right | 2.1 km || 
|-id=393 bgcolor=#d6d6d6
| 602393 ||  || — || April 24, 2014 || Mount Lemmon || Mount Lemmon Survey ||  || align=right | 2.1 km || 
|-id=394 bgcolor=#E9E9E9
| 602394 ||  || — || April 21, 2014 || Mount Lemmon || Mount Lemmon Survey ||  || align=right | 1.2 km || 
|-id=395 bgcolor=#d6d6d6
| 602395 ||  || — || April 25, 2014 || Mount Lemmon || Mount Lemmon Survey ||  || align=right | 2.5 km || 
|-id=396 bgcolor=#E9E9E9
| 602396 ||  || — || May 3, 2014 || Mount Lemmon || Mount Lemmon Survey ||  || align=right | 1.3 km || 
|-id=397 bgcolor=#d6d6d6
| 602397 ||  || — || May 3, 2014 || Mount Lemmon || Mount Lemmon Survey ||  || align=right | 2.3 km || 
|-id=398 bgcolor=#d6d6d6
| 602398 ||  || — || October 26, 2011 || Haleakala || Pan-STARRS ||  || align=right | 2.1 km || 
|-id=399 bgcolor=#d6d6d6
| 602399 ||  || — || December 13, 2006 || Kitt Peak || Spacewatch ||  || align=right | 2.2 km || 
|-id=400 bgcolor=#d6d6d6
| 602400 ||  || — || May 2, 2014 || WISE || WISE || Tj (2.99) || align=right | 3.6 km || 
|}

602401–602500 

|-bgcolor=#E9E9E9
| 602401 ||  || — || May 3, 2014 || Mount Lemmon || Mount Lemmon Survey ||  || align=right | 1.3 km || 
|-id=402 bgcolor=#d6d6d6
| 602402 ||  || — || October 20, 2011 || Mount Lemmon || Mount Lemmon Survey || Tj (2.99) || align=right | 3.0 km || 
|-id=403 bgcolor=#d6d6d6
| 602403 ||  || — || May 4, 2014 || Mount Lemmon || Mount Lemmon Survey ||  || align=right | 2.3 km || 
|-id=404 bgcolor=#E9E9E9
| 602404 ||  || — || April 4, 2014 || Mount Lemmon || Mount Lemmon Survey ||  || align=right data-sort-value="0.97" | 970 m || 
|-id=405 bgcolor=#E9E9E9
| 602405 ||  || — || April 4, 2014 || Haleakala || Pan-STARRS ||  || align=right | 1.9 km || 
|-id=406 bgcolor=#d6d6d6
| 602406 ||  || — || May 4, 2014 || Mount Lemmon || Mount Lemmon Survey ||  || align=right | 2.3 km || 
|-id=407 bgcolor=#E9E9E9
| 602407 ||  || — || February 7, 2013 || Oukaimeden || C. Rinner ||  || align=right | 2.8 km || 
|-id=408 bgcolor=#d6d6d6
| 602408 ||  || — || May 4, 2014 || Mount Lemmon || Mount Lemmon Survey ||  || align=right | 1.8 km || 
|-id=409 bgcolor=#d6d6d6
| 602409 ||  || — || April 30, 2014 || Haleakala || Pan-STARRS ||  || align=right | 1.8 km || 
|-id=410 bgcolor=#d6d6d6
| 602410 ||  || — || May 2, 2014 || Kitt Peak || Spacewatch ||  || align=right | 2.2 km || 
|-id=411 bgcolor=#d6d6d6
| 602411 ||  || — || May 6, 2014 || Haleakala || Pan-STARRS ||  || align=right | 2.0 km || 
|-id=412 bgcolor=#d6d6d6
| 602412 ||  || — || May 8, 2014 || Haleakala || Pan-STARRS ||  || align=right | 2.0 km || 
|-id=413 bgcolor=#d6d6d6
| 602413 ||  || — || July 8, 2005 || Kitt Peak || Spacewatch ||  || align=right | 2.6 km || 
|-id=414 bgcolor=#fefefe
| 602414 ||  || — || April 9, 2014 || Haleakala || Pan-STARRS || H || align=right data-sort-value="0.67" | 670 m || 
|-id=415 bgcolor=#d6d6d6
| 602415 ||  || — || June 24, 2009 || Kitt Peak || Spacewatch ||  || align=right | 2.0 km || 
|-id=416 bgcolor=#d6d6d6
| 602416 ||  || — || May 7, 2014 || Haleakala || Pan-STARRS ||  || align=right | 2.0 km || 
|-id=417 bgcolor=#E9E9E9
| 602417 ||  || — || April 8, 2014 || Mount Lemmon || Mount Lemmon Survey ||  || align=right | 1.9 km || 
|-id=418 bgcolor=#d6d6d6
| 602418 ||  || — || May 1, 2014 || Mount Lemmon || Mount Lemmon Survey ||  || align=right | 1.9 km || 
|-id=419 bgcolor=#E9E9E9
| 602419 ||  || — || May 1, 2014 || Mount Lemmon || Mount Lemmon Survey ||  || align=right | 1.3 km || 
|-id=420 bgcolor=#d6d6d6
| 602420 ||  || — || October 2, 2010 || Nogales || M. Schwartz, P. R. Holvorcem || EOS || align=right | 2.5 km || 
|-id=421 bgcolor=#d6d6d6
| 602421 ||  || — || April 30, 2014 || Haleakala || Pan-STARRS ||  || align=right | 1.9 km || 
|-id=422 bgcolor=#d6d6d6
| 602422 ||  || — || March 12, 2014 || Haleakala || Pan-STARRS ||  || align=right | 2.4 km || 
|-id=423 bgcolor=#E9E9E9
| 602423 ||  || — || April 30, 2014 || Haleakala || Pan-STARRS ||  || align=right | 1.9 km || 
|-id=424 bgcolor=#d6d6d6
| 602424 ||  || — || May 6, 2014 || Haleakala || Pan-STARRS ||  || align=right | 3.0 km || 
|-id=425 bgcolor=#d6d6d6
| 602425 ||  || — || May 1, 2014 || Mount Lemmon || Mount Lemmon Survey ||  || align=right | 2.3 km || 
|-id=426 bgcolor=#E9E9E9
| 602426 ||  || — || May 5, 2014 || Mount Lemmon || Mount Lemmon Survey ||  || align=right data-sort-value="0.72" | 720 m || 
|-id=427 bgcolor=#d6d6d6
| 602427 ||  || — || May 10, 2014 || Haleakala || Pan-STARRS ||  || align=right | 3.0 km || 
|-id=428 bgcolor=#d6d6d6
| 602428 ||  || — || May 3, 2014 || Mount Lemmon || Mount Lemmon Survey ||  || align=right | 2.1 km || 
|-id=429 bgcolor=#d6d6d6
| 602429 ||  || — || April 24, 2014 || Kitt Peak || Spacewatch ||  || align=right | 2.1 km || 
|-id=430 bgcolor=#d6d6d6
| 602430 ||  || — || May 6, 2014 || Haleakala || Pan-STARRS ||  || align=right | 2.2 km || 
|-id=431 bgcolor=#d6d6d6
| 602431 ||  || — || March 8, 2013 || Haleakala || Pan-STARRS ||  || align=right | 2.1 km || 
|-id=432 bgcolor=#d6d6d6
| 602432 ||  || — || February 13, 2013 || Haleakala || Pan-STARRS ||  || align=right | 2.1 km || 
|-id=433 bgcolor=#d6d6d6
| 602433 ||  || — || May 7, 2014 || Haleakala || Pan-STARRS ||  || align=right | 2.3 km || 
|-id=434 bgcolor=#d6d6d6
| 602434 ||  || — || May 7, 2014 || Haleakala || Pan-STARRS ||  || align=right | 2.2 km || 
|-id=435 bgcolor=#d6d6d6
| 602435 ||  || — || May 7, 2014 || Haleakala || Pan-STARRS ||  || align=right | 2.1 km || 
|-id=436 bgcolor=#d6d6d6
| 602436 ||  || — || May 10, 2014 || Kitt Peak || Spacewatch ||  || align=right | 2.2 km || 
|-id=437 bgcolor=#d6d6d6
| 602437 ||  || — || May 6, 2014 || Haleakala || Pan-STARRS ||  || align=right | 2.1 km || 
|-id=438 bgcolor=#d6d6d6
| 602438 ||  || — || May 8, 2014 || Haleakala || Pan-STARRS ||  || align=right | 1.8 km || 
|-id=439 bgcolor=#d6d6d6
| 602439 ||  || — || May 8, 2014 || Haleakala || Pan-STARRS ||  || align=right | 1.8 km || 
|-id=440 bgcolor=#d6d6d6
| 602440 ||  || — || May 7, 2014 || Haleakala || Pan-STARRS ||  || align=right | 2.0 km || 
|-id=441 bgcolor=#d6d6d6
| 602441 ||  || — || May 6, 2014 || Haleakala || Pan-STARRS ||  || align=right | 1.9 km || 
|-id=442 bgcolor=#d6d6d6
| 602442 ||  || — || May 10, 2014 || Haleakala || Pan-STARRS ||  || align=right | 2.0 km || 
|-id=443 bgcolor=#d6d6d6
| 602443 ||  || — || May 4, 2014 || Haleakala || Pan-STARRS ||  || align=right | 2.1 km || 
|-id=444 bgcolor=#E9E9E9
| 602444 ||  || — || May 8, 2014 || Haleakala || Pan-STARRS ||  || align=right | 1.3 km || 
|-id=445 bgcolor=#d6d6d6
| 602445 ||  || — || May 8, 2014 || Haleakala || Pan-STARRS ||  || align=right | 2.2 km || 
|-id=446 bgcolor=#fefefe
| 602446 ||  || — || October 7, 2008 || Mount Lemmon || Mount Lemmon Survey ||  || align=right data-sort-value="0.72" | 720 m || 
|-id=447 bgcolor=#d6d6d6
| 602447 ||  || — || May 9, 2014 || Haleakala || Pan-STARRS ||  || align=right | 2.6 km || 
|-id=448 bgcolor=#d6d6d6
| 602448 ||  || — || April 19, 2009 || Catalina || CSS || Tj (2.84) || align=right | 3.2 km || 
|-id=449 bgcolor=#d6d6d6
| 602449 ||  || — || November 17, 2006 || Kitt Peak || Spacewatch ||  || align=right | 2.1 km || 
|-id=450 bgcolor=#d6d6d6
| 602450 ||  || — || May 21, 2014 || Haleakala || Pan-STARRS ||  || align=right | 1.6 km || 
|-id=451 bgcolor=#E9E9E9
| 602451 ||  || — || December 11, 2012 || Mount Lemmon || Mount Lemmon Survey ||  || align=right | 1.5 km || 
|-id=452 bgcolor=#d6d6d6
| 602452 ||  || — || October 2, 2010 || Mount Lemmon || Mount Lemmon Survey ||  || align=right | 2.3 km || 
|-id=453 bgcolor=#d6d6d6
| 602453 ||  || — || May 8, 2014 || Haleakala || Pan-STARRS ||  || align=right | 1.6 km || 
|-id=454 bgcolor=#E9E9E9
| 602454 ||  || — || April 30, 2014 || Haleakala || Pan-STARRS ||  || align=right | 1.7 km || 
|-id=455 bgcolor=#d6d6d6
| 602455 ||  || — || April 4, 2014 || Kitt Peak || Spacewatch ||  || align=right | 2.3 km || 
|-id=456 bgcolor=#E9E9E9
| 602456 ||  || — || May 4, 2000 || Apache Point || SDSS Collaboration ||  || align=right | 2.3 km || 
|-id=457 bgcolor=#E9E9E9
| 602457 ||  || — || January 28, 2004 || Socorro || LINEAR ||  || align=right | 2.6 km || 
|-id=458 bgcolor=#d6d6d6
| 602458 ||  || — || October 12, 2005 || Kitt Peak || Spacewatch ||  || align=right | 2.4 km || 
|-id=459 bgcolor=#FA8072
| 602459 ||  || — || August 19, 2006 || Palomar || NEAT ||  || align=right data-sort-value="0.58" | 580 m || 
|-id=460 bgcolor=#d6d6d6
| 602460 ||  || — || April 26, 1995 || Kitt Peak || Spacewatch ||  || align=right | 2.4 km || 
|-id=461 bgcolor=#d6d6d6
| 602461 ||  || — || October 19, 2011 || Mount Lemmon || Mount Lemmon Survey ||  || align=right | 1.9 km || 
|-id=462 bgcolor=#d6d6d6
| 602462 ||  || — || October 3, 2005 || Catalina || CSS ||  || align=right | 2.4 km || 
|-id=463 bgcolor=#d6d6d6
| 602463 ||  || — || May 7, 2014 || Haleakala || Pan-STARRS ||  || align=right | 2.2 km || 
|-id=464 bgcolor=#E9E9E9
| 602464 ||  || — || September 24, 2011 || Haleakala || Pan-STARRS ||  || align=right | 2.4 km || 
|-id=465 bgcolor=#d6d6d6
| 602465 ||  || — || May 3, 2014 || Mount Lemmon || Mount Lemmon Survey ||  || align=right | 2.0 km || 
|-id=466 bgcolor=#d6d6d6
| 602466 ||  || — || May 22, 2014 || Haleakala || Pan-STARRS ||  || align=right | 2.2 km || 
|-id=467 bgcolor=#d6d6d6
| 602467 ||  || — || May 7, 2014 || Haleakala || Pan-STARRS ||  || align=right | 1.8 km || 
|-id=468 bgcolor=#d6d6d6
| 602468 ||  || — || March 26, 2014 || Mount Lemmon || Mount Lemmon Survey ||  || align=right | 2.1 km || 
|-id=469 bgcolor=#E9E9E9
| 602469 ||  || — || February 28, 2009 || Mount Lemmon || Mount Lemmon Survey ||  || align=right | 1.8 km || 
|-id=470 bgcolor=#fefefe
| 602470 ||  || — || May 7, 2014 || Haleakala || Pan-STARRS || H || align=right data-sort-value="0.45" | 450 m || 
|-id=471 bgcolor=#E9E9E9
| 602471 ||  || — || May 8, 2014 || Haleakala || Pan-STARRS ||  || align=right | 1.7 km || 
|-id=472 bgcolor=#d6d6d6
| 602472 ||  || — || February 24, 2008 || Kitt Peak || Spacewatch ||  || align=right | 2.5 km || 
|-id=473 bgcolor=#fefefe
| 602473 ||  || — || November 4, 2012 || Haleakala || Pan-STARRS || H || align=right data-sort-value="0.50" | 500 m || 
|-id=474 bgcolor=#d6d6d6
| 602474 ||  || — || March 11, 2008 || Mount Lemmon || Mount Lemmon Survey || TIR || align=right | 2.0 km || 
|-id=475 bgcolor=#d6d6d6
| 602475 ||  || — || May 1, 2014 || Mount Lemmon || Mount Lemmon Survey ||  || align=right | 2.1 km || 
|-id=476 bgcolor=#E9E9E9
| 602476 ||  || — || August 8, 2010 || Charleston || R. Holmes || EUN || align=right | 1.2 km || 
|-id=477 bgcolor=#d6d6d6
| 602477 ||  || — || April 1, 2003 || Apache Point || SDSS Collaboration ||  || align=right | 2.1 km || 
|-id=478 bgcolor=#d6d6d6
| 602478 ||  || — || October 8, 2005 || Kitt Peak || Spacewatch ||  || align=right | 2.1 km || 
|-id=479 bgcolor=#fefefe
| 602479 ||  || — || May 4, 2014 || Mount Lemmon || Mount Lemmon Survey || H || align=right data-sort-value="0.50" | 500 m || 
|-id=480 bgcolor=#d6d6d6
| 602480 ||  || — || May 24, 2014 || Mount Lemmon || Mount Lemmon Survey ||  || align=right | 2.0 km || 
|-id=481 bgcolor=#E9E9E9
| 602481 ||  || — || January 19, 2013 || Mount Lemmon || Mount Lemmon Survey ||  || align=right | 1.5 km || 
|-id=482 bgcolor=#d6d6d6
| 602482 ||  || — || May 24, 2014 || Haleakala || Pan-STARRS ||  || align=right | 2.0 km || 
|-id=483 bgcolor=#fefefe
| 602483 ||  || — || May 21, 2014 || Haleakala || Pan-STARRS ||  || align=right data-sort-value="0.52" | 520 m || 
|-id=484 bgcolor=#d6d6d6
| 602484 ||  || — || February 29, 2008 || Mount Lemmon || Mount Lemmon Survey ||  || align=right | 1.8 km || 
|-id=485 bgcolor=#d6d6d6
| 602485 ||  || — || August 30, 2005 || Palomar || NEAT || EOS || align=right | 2.1 km || 
|-id=486 bgcolor=#d6d6d6
| 602486 ||  || — || May 22, 2014 || Mount Lemmon || Mount Lemmon Survey ||  || align=right | 1.5 km || 
|-id=487 bgcolor=#d6d6d6
| 602487 ||  || — || May 22, 2014 || Mount Lemmon || Mount Lemmon Survey ||  || align=right | 2.2 km || 
|-id=488 bgcolor=#E9E9E9
| 602488 ||  || — || October 3, 2006 || Mount Lemmon || Mount Lemmon Survey ||  || align=right | 1.3 km || 
|-id=489 bgcolor=#d6d6d6
| 602489 ||  || — || September 10, 2010 || Mount Lemmon || Mount Lemmon Survey ||  || align=right | 1.8 km || 
|-id=490 bgcolor=#d6d6d6
| 602490 ||  || — || August 26, 2009 || Catalina || CSS ||  || align=right | 2.4 km || 
|-id=491 bgcolor=#d6d6d6
| 602491 ||  || — || February 14, 2013 || Haleakala || Pan-STARRS ||  || align=right | 1.9 km || 
|-id=492 bgcolor=#d6d6d6
| 602492 ||  || — || October 9, 2005 || Kitt Peak || Spacewatch ||  || align=right | 2.2 km || 
|-id=493 bgcolor=#d6d6d6
| 602493 ||  || — || May 2, 2014 || Mount Lemmon || Mount Lemmon Survey ||  || align=right | 2.2 km || 
|-id=494 bgcolor=#d6d6d6
| 602494 ||  || — || May 7, 2014 || Haleakala || Pan-STARRS ||  || align=right | 2.1 km || 
|-id=495 bgcolor=#fefefe
| 602495 ||  || — || December 31, 2007 || Kitt Peak || Spacewatch || H || align=right data-sort-value="0.53" | 530 m || 
|-id=496 bgcolor=#d6d6d6
| 602496 ||  || — || March 10, 2003 || Kitt Peak || Spacewatch ||  || align=right | 2.5 km || 
|-id=497 bgcolor=#d6d6d6
| 602497 ||  || — || May 10, 2014 || Haleakala || Pan-STARRS || Tj (2.93) || align=right | 3.1 km || 
|-id=498 bgcolor=#d6d6d6
| 602498 ||  || — || February 3, 2013 || Haleakala || Pan-STARRS ||  || align=right | 2.6 km || 
|-id=499 bgcolor=#d6d6d6
| 602499 ||  || — || May 28, 2014 || Haleakala || Pan-STARRS ||  || align=right | 2.0 km || 
|-id=500 bgcolor=#d6d6d6
| 602500 ||  || — || May 23, 2014 || Haleakala || Pan-STARRS ||  || align=right | 2.1 km || 
|}

602501–602600 

|-bgcolor=#d6d6d6
| 602501 ||  || — || May 23, 2014 || Haleakala || Pan-STARRS ||  || align=right | 1.8 km || 
|-id=502 bgcolor=#d6d6d6
| 602502 ||  || — || May 23, 2014 || Haleakala || Pan-STARRS ||  || align=right | 2.1 km || 
|-id=503 bgcolor=#E9E9E9
| 602503 ||  || — || May 28, 2014 || Mount Lemmon || Mount Lemmon Survey ||  || align=right | 1.3 km || 
|-id=504 bgcolor=#d6d6d6
| 602504 ||  || — || May 31, 2014 || Haleakala || Pan-STARRS ||  || align=right | 2.1 km || 
|-id=505 bgcolor=#d6d6d6
| 602505 ||  || — || May 7, 2014 || Haleakala || Pan-STARRS ||  || align=right | 2.1 km || 
|-id=506 bgcolor=#d6d6d6
| 602506 ||  || — || May 21, 2014 || Haleakala || Pan-STARRS ||  || align=right | 2.3 km || 
|-id=507 bgcolor=#d6d6d6
| 602507 ||  || — || November 11, 2010 || Mount Lemmon || Mount Lemmon Survey ||  || align=right | 2.1 km || 
|-id=508 bgcolor=#d6d6d6
| 602508 ||  || — || May 25, 2014 || Haleakala || Pan-STARRS ||  || align=right | 2.0 km || 
|-id=509 bgcolor=#d6d6d6
| 602509 ||  || — || April 25, 2003 || Kitt Peak || Spacewatch ||  || align=right | 1.9 km || 
|-id=510 bgcolor=#d6d6d6
| 602510 ||  || — || May 21, 2014 || Haleakala || Pan-STARRS ||  || align=right | 2.0 km || 
|-id=511 bgcolor=#d6d6d6
| 602511 ||  || — || September 18, 2015 || Mount Lemmon || Mount Lemmon Survey ||  || align=right | 1.9 km || 
|-id=512 bgcolor=#d6d6d6
| 602512 ||  || — || May 23, 2014 || Haleakala || Pan-STARRS ||  || align=right | 2.0 km || 
|-id=513 bgcolor=#d6d6d6
| 602513 ||  || — || May 21, 2014 || Haleakala || Pan-STARRS ||  || align=right | 1.9 km || 
|-id=514 bgcolor=#d6d6d6
| 602514 ||  || — || May 23, 2014 || Haleakala || Pan-STARRS ||  || align=right | 2.1 km || 
|-id=515 bgcolor=#d6d6d6
| 602515 ||  || — || May 21, 2014 || Haleakala || Pan-STARRS ||  || align=right | 2.0 km || 
|-id=516 bgcolor=#d6d6d6
| 602516 ||  || — || November 6, 2016 || Mount Lemmon || Mount Lemmon Survey ||  || align=right | 2.3 km || 
|-id=517 bgcolor=#d6d6d6
| 602517 ||  || — || August 21, 2015 || Haleakala || Pan-STARRS ||  || align=right | 2.2 km || 
|-id=518 bgcolor=#d6d6d6
| 602518 ||  || — || May 7, 2014 || Haleakala || Pan-STARRS ||  || align=right | 1.7 km || 
|-id=519 bgcolor=#d6d6d6
| 602519 ||  || — || May 21, 2014 || Haleakala || Pan-STARRS ||  || align=right | 2.3 km || 
|-id=520 bgcolor=#fefefe
| 602520 ||  || — || May 23, 2014 || Haleakala || Pan-STARRS ||  || align=right data-sort-value="0.53" | 530 m || 
|-id=521 bgcolor=#d6d6d6
| 602521 ||  || — || May 23, 2014 || Haleakala || Pan-STARRS ||  || align=right | 2.2 km || 
|-id=522 bgcolor=#d6d6d6
| 602522 ||  || — || April 30, 2014 || Haleakala || Pan-STARRS ||  || align=right | 2.1 km || 
|-id=523 bgcolor=#d6d6d6
| 602523 ||  || — || May 22, 2014 || Mount Lemmon || Mount Lemmon Survey ||  || align=right | 2.2 km || 
|-id=524 bgcolor=#E9E9E9
| 602524 ||  || — || October 25, 2011 || Haleakala || Pan-STARRS ||  || align=right | 1.8 km || 
|-id=525 bgcolor=#d6d6d6
| 602525 ||  || — || May 21, 2014 || Mount Lemmon || Mount Lemmon Survey ||  || align=right | 2.1 km || 
|-id=526 bgcolor=#d6d6d6
| 602526 ||  || — || June 4, 2014 || Mount Lemmon || Mount Lemmon Survey ||  || align=right | 2.8 km || 
|-id=527 bgcolor=#d6d6d6
| 602527 ||  || — || May 10, 2014 || Haleakala || Pan-STARRS ||  || align=right | 2.2 km || 
|-id=528 bgcolor=#d6d6d6
| 602528 ||  || — || October 5, 2004 || Kitt Peak || Spacewatch ||  || align=right | 1.6 km || 
|-id=529 bgcolor=#d6d6d6
| 602529 ||  || — || April 24, 2003 || Kitt Peak || Spacewatch ||  || align=right | 2.4 km || 
|-id=530 bgcolor=#fefefe
| 602530 ||  || — || September 25, 2011 || Haleakala || Pan-STARRS ||  || align=right data-sort-value="0.60" | 600 m || 
|-id=531 bgcolor=#d6d6d6
| 602531 ||  || — || December 9, 2010 || Mount Lemmon || Mount Lemmon Survey ||  || align=right | 5.5 km || 
|-id=532 bgcolor=#fefefe
| 602532 ||  || — || April 8, 2014 || Haleakala || Pan-STARRS || H || align=right data-sort-value="0.73" | 730 m || 
|-id=533 bgcolor=#d6d6d6
| 602533 ||  || — || September 18, 2004 || Siding Spring || SSS || EUP || align=right | 3.9 km || 
|-id=534 bgcolor=#d6d6d6
| 602534 ||  || — || June 3, 2014 || Haleakala || Pan-STARRS ||  || align=right | 1.9 km || 
|-id=535 bgcolor=#d6d6d6
| 602535 ||  || — || June 4, 2014 || Haleakala || Pan-STARRS ||  || align=right | 2.3 km || 
|-id=536 bgcolor=#d6d6d6
| 602536 ||  || — || February 14, 2013 || Nogales || M. Schwartz, P. R. Holvorcem ||  || align=right | 2.8 km || 
|-id=537 bgcolor=#FA8072
| 602537 ||  || — || June 4, 2014 || Haleakala || Pan-STARRS || H || align=right data-sort-value="0.37" | 370 m || 
|-id=538 bgcolor=#d6d6d6
| 602538 ||  || — || June 4, 2014 || Haleakala || Pan-STARRS ||  || align=right | 3.4 km || 
|-id=539 bgcolor=#E9E9E9
| 602539 ||  || — || September 12, 2015 || Haleakala || Pan-STARRS ||  || align=right | 1.0 km || 
|-id=540 bgcolor=#d6d6d6
| 602540 ||  || — || June 5, 2014 || Haleakala || Pan-STARRS ||  || align=right | 1.9 km || 
|-id=541 bgcolor=#d6d6d6
| 602541 ||  || — || June 5, 2014 || Haleakala || Pan-STARRS ||  || align=right | 1.7 km || 
|-id=542 bgcolor=#d6d6d6
| 602542 ||  || — || June 4, 2014 || Haleakala || Pan-STARRS ||  || align=right | 2.2 km || 
|-id=543 bgcolor=#fefefe
| 602543 ||  || — || April 28, 2014 || Haleakala || Pan-STARRS || H || align=right data-sort-value="0.52" | 520 m || 
|-id=544 bgcolor=#fefefe
| 602544 ||  || — || June 21, 2011 || Kitt Peak || Spacewatch ||  || align=right data-sort-value="0.55" | 550 m || 
|-id=545 bgcolor=#d6d6d6
| 602545 ||  || — || April 10, 2003 || Kitt Peak || Spacewatch ||  || align=right | 2.2 km || 
|-id=546 bgcolor=#E9E9E9
| 602546 ||  || — || June 19, 2014 || Kitt Peak || Spacewatch ||  || align=right | 1.6 km || 
|-id=547 bgcolor=#d6d6d6
| 602547 ||  || — || September 21, 2003 || Kitt Peak || Spacewatch ||  || align=right | 2.8 km || 
|-id=548 bgcolor=#d6d6d6
| 602548 ||  || — || August 20, 2009 || Bergisch Gladbach || W. Bickel ||  || align=right | 3.4 km || 
|-id=549 bgcolor=#d6d6d6
| 602549 ||  || — || January 13, 2013 || Mount Lemmon || Mount Lemmon Survey ||  || align=right | 2.5 km || 
|-id=550 bgcolor=#d6d6d6
| 602550 ||  || — || February 12, 2013 || ESA OGS || ESA OGS ||  || align=right | 2.4 km || 
|-id=551 bgcolor=#E9E9E9
| 602551 ||  || — || July 4, 2005 || Kitt Peak || Spacewatch ||  || align=right | 1.4 km || 
|-id=552 bgcolor=#fefefe
| 602552 ||  || — || June 23, 2014 || Mount Lemmon || Mount Lemmon Survey ||  || align=right data-sort-value="0.60" | 600 m || 
|-id=553 bgcolor=#fefefe
| 602553 ||  || — || January 18, 2013 || Kitt Peak || Spacewatch ||  || align=right data-sort-value="0.58" | 580 m || 
|-id=554 bgcolor=#d6d6d6
| 602554 ||  || — || January 10, 2007 || Kitt Peak || Spacewatch ||  || align=right | 2.5 km || 
|-id=555 bgcolor=#fefefe
| 602555 ||  || — || September 25, 2011 || Andrushivka || Y. Ivaščenko, P. Kyrylenko ||  || align=right data-sort-value="0.59" | 590 m || 
|-id=556 bgcolor=#d6d6d6
| 602556 ||  || — || June 4, 2014 || Haleakala || Pan-STARRS ||  || align=right | 3.1 km || 
|-id=557 bgcolor=#d6d6d6
| 602557 ||  || — || August 17, 2009 || Catalina || CSS ||  || align=right | 2.3 km || 
|-id=558 bgcolor=#d6d6d6
| 602558 ||  || — || April 10, 2014 || Haleakala || Pan-STARRS || Tj (2.98) || align=right | 2.8 km || 
|-id=559 bgcolor=#d6d6d6
| 602559 ||  || — || February 3, 2012 || Mount Lemmon || Mount Lemmon Survey ||  || align=right | 3.3 km || 
|-id=560 bgcolor=#d6d6d6
| 602560 ||  || — || March 1, 2008 || Kitt Peak || Spacewatch ||  || align=right | 2.4 km || 
|-id=561 bgcolor=#d6d6d6
| 602561 ||  || — || May 26, 2014 || Haleakala || Pan-STARRS ||  || align=right | 2.1 km || 
|-id=562 bgcolor=#d6d6d6
| 602562 ||  || — || May 30, 2014 || Haleakala || Pan-STARRS ||  || align=right | 2.1 km || 
|-id=563 bgcolor=#d6d6d6
| 602563 ||  || — || January 2, 2011 || Mount Lemmon || Mount Lemmon Survey ||  || align=right | 3.2 km || 
|-id=564 bgcolor=#d6d6d6
| 602564 ||  || — || April 3, 2013 || Mount Lemmon || Mount Lemmon Survey ||  || align=right | 2.2 km || 
|-id=565 bgcolor=#d6d6d6
| 602565 ||  || — || June 27, 2014 || Haleakala || Pan-STARRS ||  || align=right | 3.3 km || 
|-id=566 bgcolor=#d6d6d6
| 602566 ||  || — || March 31, 2008 || Mount Lemmon || Mount Lemmon Survey ||  || align=right | 2.4 km || 
|-id=567 bgcolor=#d6d6d6
| 602567 ||  || — || June 28, 2014 || Kitt Peak || Spacewatch ||  || align=right | 2.0 km || 
|-id=568 bgcolor=#d6d6d6
| 602568 ||  || — || March 18, 2007 || Nyukasa || H. Kurosaki, A. Nakajima || EOS || align=right | 3.1 km || 
|-id=569 bgcolor=#d6d6d6
| 602569 ||  || — || May 7, 2014 || Haleakala || Pan-STARRS ||  || align=right | 1.8 km || 
|-id=570 bgcolor=#d6d6d6
| 602570 ||  || — || July 4, 2014 || Haleakala || Pan-STARRS ||  || align=right | 2.3 km || 
|-id=571 bgcolor=#E9E9E9
| 602571 ||  || — || October 18, 2006 || Siding Spring || SSS ||  || align=right | 1.6 km || 
|-id=572 bgcolor=#C2E0FF
| 602572 ||  || — || June 28, 2014 || Haleakala || Pan-STARRS || SDO || align=right | 172 km || 
|-id=573 bgcolor=#d6d6d6
| 602573 ||  || — || June 21, 2014 || Haleakala || Pan-STARRS ||  || align=right | 2.9 km || 
|-id=574 bgcolor=#d6d6d6
| 602574 ||  || — || May 3, 2008 || Kitt Peak || Spacewatch ||  || align=right | 2.0 km || 
|-id=575 bgcolor=#fefefe
| 602575 ||  || — || April 23, 2007 || Kitt Peak || Spacewatch ||  || align=right data-sort-value="0.52" | 520 m || 
|-id=576 bgcolor=#d6d6d6
| 602576 ||  || — || June 29, 2014 || Haleakala || Pan-STARRS ||  || align=right | 2.9 km || 
|-id=577 bgcolor=#d6d6d6
| 602577 ||  || — || April 3, 2008 || Mount Lemmon || Mount Lemmon Survey ||  || align=right | 1.9 km || 
|-id=578 bgcolor=#FA8072
| 602578 ||  || — || January 2, 2016 || Mount Lemmon || Mount Lemmon Survey || H || align=right data-sort-value="0.55" | 550 m || 
|-id=579 bgcolor=#d6d6d6
| 602579 ||  || — || April 12, 2013 || Haleakala || Pan-STARRS ||  || align=right | 2.4 km || 
|-id=580 bgcolor=#d6d6d6
| 602580 ||  || — || June 30, 2014 || Haleakala || Pan-STARRS ||  || align=right | 2.9 km || 
|-id=581 bgcolor=#d6d6d6
| 602581 ||  || — || June 30, 2014 || Haleakala || Pan-STARRS ||  || align=right | 2.0 km || 
|-id=582 bgcolor=#d6d6d6
| 602582 ||  || — || June 29, 2014 || Haleakala || Pan-STARRS ||  || align=right | 2.5 km || 
|-id=583 bgcolor=#d6d6d6
| 602583 ||  || — || June 24, 2014 || Haleakala || Pan-STARRS ||  || align=right | 2.0 km || 
|-id=584 bgcolor=#d6d6d6
| 602584 ||  || — || June 27, 2014 || Haleakala || Pan-STARRS ||  || align=right | 1.9 km || 
|-id=585 bgcolor=#d6d6d6
| 602585 ||  || — || June 24, 2014 || Haleakala || Pan-STARRS ||  || align=right | 2.1 km || 
|-id=586 bgcolor=#d6d6d6
| 602586 ||  || — || June 29, 2014 || Haleakala || Pan-STARRS ||  || align=right | 2.1 km || 
|-id=587 bgcolor=#d6d6d6
| 602587 ||  || — || June 27, 2014 || Haleakala || Pan-STARRS ||  || align=right | 2.3 km || 
|-id=588 bgcolor=#d6d6d6
| 602588 ||  || — || February 23, 2014 || Mount Lemmon || Mount Lemmon Survey ||  || align=right | 3.0 km || 
|-id=589 bgcolor=#d6d6d6
| 602589 ||  || — || December 31, 2011 || Kitt Peak || Spacewatch ||  || align=right | 2.4 km || 
|-id=590 bgcolor=#d6d6d6
| 602590 ||  || — || June 4, 2014 || Haleakala || Pan-STARRS ||  || align=right | 2.6 km || 
|-id=591 bgcolor=#fefefe
| 602591 ||  || — || May 28, 2014 || Mount Lemmon || Mount Lemmon Survey || H || align=right data-sort-value="0.54" | 540 m || 
|-id=592 bgcolor=#d6d6d6
| 602592 ||  || — || November 3, 2004 || Kitt Peak || Spacewatch ||  || align=right | 3.9 km || 
|-id=593 bgcolor=#d6d6d6
| 602593 ||  || — || July 2, 2014 || Haleakala || Pan-STARRS ||  || align=right | 2.6 km || 
|-id=594 bgcolor=#d6d6d6
| 602594 ||  || — || November 30, 2005 || Kitt Peak || Spacewatch ||  || align=right | 2.6 km || 
|-id=595 bgcolor=#d6d6d6
| 602595 ||  || — || June 23, 2014 || Kitt Peak || Spacewatch ||  || align=right | 2.1 km || 
|-id=596 bgcolor=#d6d6d6
| 602596 ||  || — || July 2, 2014 || Haleakala || Pan-STARRS ||  || align=right | 2.4 km || 
|-id=597 bgcolor=#d6d6d6
| 602597 ||  || — || July 2, 2014 || Haleakala || Pan-STARRS ||  || align=right | 1.7 km || 
|-id=598 bgcolor=#d6d6d6
| 602598 ||  || — || December 26, 2000 || Haleakala || AMOS ||  || align=right | 3.3 km || 
|-id=599 bgcolor=#d6d6d6
| 602599 ||  || — || October 27, 2005 || Kitt Peak || Spacewatch ||  || align=right | 3.1 km || 
|-id=600 bgcolor=#d6d6d6
| 602600 ||  || — || April 16, 2013 || Cerro Tololo-DECam || CTIO-DECam || 7:4 || align=right | 2.0 km || 
|}

602601–602700 

|-bgcolor=#fefefe
| 602601 ||  || — || July 3, 2014 || Haleakala || Pan-STARRS ||  || align=right data-sort-value="0.69" | 690 m || 
|-id=602 bgcolor=#E9E9E9
| 602602 ||  || — || July 1, 2014 || Haleakala || Pan-STARRS ||  || align=right data-sort-value="0.84" | 840 m || 
|-id=603 bgcolor=#d6d6d6
| 602603 ||  || — || March 14, 2013 || Kitt Peak || Spacewatch ||  || align=right | 1.9 km || 
|-id=604 bgcolor=#E9E9E9
| 602604 ||  || — || January 19, 2012 || Kitt Peak || Spacewatch ||  || align=right | 2.5 km || 
|-id=605 bgcolor=#d6d6d6
| 602605 ||  || — || April 30, 1997 || Kitt Peak || Spacewatch ||  || align=right | 4.4 km || 
|-id=606 bgcolor=#E9E9E9
| 602606 ||  || — || July 26, 2005 || Palomar || NEAT ||  || align=right | 3.3 km || 
|-id=607 bgcolor=#d6d6d6
| 602607 ||  || — || May 2, 2013 || Kitt Peak || Spacewatch ||  || align=right | 2.8 km || 
|-id=608 bgcolor=#d6d6d6
| 602608 ||  || — || July 6, 2014 || Haleakala || Pan-STARRS ||  || align=right | 2.4 km || 
|-id=609 bgcolor=#d6d6d6
| 602609 ||  || — || July 2, 2014 || Haleakala || Pan-STARRS ||  || align=right | 2.1 km || 
|-id=610 bgcolor=#d6d6d6
| 602610 ||  || — || July 8, 2014 || Haleakala || Pan-STARRS ||  || align=right | 2.1 km || 
|-id=611 bgcolor=#E9E9E9
| 602611 ||  || — || July 10, 2014 || Haleakala || Pan-STARRS ||  || align=right | 2.7 km || 
|-id=612 bgcolor=#d6d6d6
| 602612 ||  || — || July 8, 2014 || Haleakala || Pan-STARRS ||  || align=right | 3.3 km || 
|-id=613 bgcolor=#d6d6d6
| 602613 ||  || — || July 7, 2014 || Haleakala || Pan-STARRS ||  || align=right | 1.9 km || 
|-id=614 bgcolor=#d6d6d6
| 602614 ||  || — || July 8, 2014 || Haleakala || Pan-STARRS ||  || align=right | 2.1 km || 
|-id=615 bgcolor=#E9E9E9
| 602615 ||  || — || July 1, 2014 || Haleakala || Pan-STARRS ||  || align=right data-sort-value="0.97" | 970 m || 
|-id=616 bgcolor=#d6d6d6
| 602616 ||  || — || July 2, 2014 || Haleakala || Pan-STARRS ||  || align=right | 2.8 km || 
|-id=617 bgcolor=#d6d6d6
| 602617 ||  || — || July 1, 2014 || Haleakala || Pan-STARRS ||  || align=right | 2.2 km || 
|-id=618 bgcolor=#E9E9E9
| 602618 ||  || — || July 4, 2014 || Haleakala || Pan-STARRS ||  || align=right | 1.1 km || 
|-id=619 bgcolor=#fefefe
| 602619 ||  || — || October 3, 2011 || Taunus || S. Karge, U. Zimmer ||  || align=right data-sort-value="0.59" | 590 m || 
|-id=620 bgcolor=#d6d6d6
| 602620 ||  || — || July 26, 2014 || Elena Remote || A. Oreshko ||  || align=right | 2.3 km || 
|-id=621 bgcolor=#E9E9E9
| 602621 ||  || — || January 13, 2008 || Mount Lemmon || Mount Lemmon Survey ||  || align=right | 1.1 km || 
|-id=622 bgcolor=#d6d6d6
| 602622 ||  || — || November 14, 2010 || Mount Lemmon || Mount Lemmon Survey ||  || align=right | 2.2 km || 
|-id=623 bgcolor=#E9E9E9
| 602623 ||  || — || April 7, 2013 || Mount Lemmon || Mount Lemmon Survey ||  || align=right | 1.7 km || 
|-id=624 bgcolor=#d6d6d6
| 602624 ||  || — || April 17, 2013 || Haleakala || Pan-STARRS ||  || align=right | 2.5 km || 
|-id=625 bgcolor=#fefefe
| 602625 ||  || — || July 25, 2014 || Haleakala || Pan-STARRS ||  || align=right data-sort-value="0.60" | 600 m || 
|-id=626 bgcolor=#d6d6d6
| 602626 ||  || — || July 25, 2014 || Haleakala || Pan-STARRS ||  || align=right | 2.5 km || 
|-id=627 bgcolor=#d6d6d6
| 602627 ||  || — || July 7, 2014 || Haleakala || Pan-STARRS ||  || align=right | 3.2 km || 
|-id=628 bgcolor=#fefefe
| 602628 ||  || — || July 25, 2014 || Haleakala || Pan-STARRS ||  || align=right data-sort-value="0.49" | 490 m || 
|-id=629 bgcolor=#d6d6d6
| 602629 ||  || — || June 27, 2014 || Haleakala || Pan-STARRS ||  || align=right | 2.3 km || 
|-id=630 bgcolor=#d6d6d6
| 602630 ||  || — || November 7, 2010 || Mount Lemmon || Mount Lemmon Survey ||  || align=right | 2.0 km || 
|-id=631 bgcolor=#d6d6d6
| 602631 ||  || — || February 20, 2006 || Mount Lemmon || Mount Lemmon Survey ||  || align=right | 3.2 km || 
|-id=632 bgcolor=#d6d6d6
| 602632 ||  || — || January 7, 2006 || Mount Lemmon || Mount Lemmon Survey ||  || align=right | 3.0 km || 
|-id=633 bgcolor=#fefefe
| 602633 ||  || — || June 1, 2003 || Nogales || P. R. Holvorcem, M. Schwartz ||  || align=right data-sort-value="0.64" | 640 m || 
|-id=634 bgcolor=#d6d6d6
| 602634 ||  || — || July 25, 2014 || Haleakala || Pan-STARRS ||  || align=right | 2.7 km || 
|-id=635 bgcolor=#fefefe
| 602635 ||  || — || July 25, 2014 || Haleakala || Pan-STARRS ||  || align=right data-sort-value="0.44" | 440 m || 
|-id=636 bgcolor=#d6d6d6
| 602636 ||  || — || July 25, 2014 || Haleakala || Pan-STARRS ||  || align=right | 2.4 km || 
|-id=637 bgcolor=#d6d6d6
| 602637 ||  || — || June 24, 2014 || Haleakala || Pan-STARRS ||  || align=right | 2.1 km || 
|-id=638 bgcolor=#d6d6d6
| 602638 ||  || — || November 30, 2011 || Mount Lemmon || Mount Lemmon Survey ||  || align=right | 2.7 km || 
|-id=639 bgcolor=#fefefe
| 602639 ||  || — || October 28, 2008 || Kitt Peak || Spacewatch ||  || align=right data-sort-value="0.58" | 580 m || 
|-id=640 bgcolor=#fefefe
| 602640 ||  || — || September 4, 2011 || Haleakala || Pan-STARRS ||  || align=right data-sort-value="0.50" | 500 m || 
|-id=641 bgcolor=#d6d6d6
| 602641 ||  || — || May 25, 2014 || Haleakala || Pan-STARRS ||  || align=right | 2.0 km || 
|-id=642 bgcolor=#E9E9E9
| 602642 ||  || — || September 2, 2010 || Mount Lemmon || Mount Lemmon Survey ||  || align=right | 1.4 km || 
|-id=643 bgcolor=#d6d6d6
| 602643 ||  || — || July 27, 2009 || Kitt Peak || Spacewatch ||  || align=right | 3.3 km || 
|-id=644 bgcolor=#d6d6d6
| 602644 ||  || — || May 9, 2014 || Haleakala || Pan-STARRS ||  || align=right | 2.4 km || 
|-id=645 bgcolor=#d6d6d6
| 602645 ||  || — || February 14, 2012 || Haleakala || Pan-STARRS ||  || align=right | 2.1 km || 
|-id=646 bgcolor=#fefefe
| 602646 ||  || — || October 9, 2004 || Kitt Peak || Spacewatch ||  || align=right data-sort-value="0.46" | 460 m || 
|-id=647 bgcolor=#fefefe
| 602647 ||  || — || October 26, 2011 || Haleakala || Pan-STARRS ||  || align=right data-sort-value="0.56" | 560 m || 
|-id=648 bgcolor=#d6d6d6
| 602648 ||  || — || July 24, 2003 || Palomar || NEAT ||  || align=right | 4.0 km || 
|-id=649 bgcolor=#d6d6d6
| 602649 ||  || — || February 10, 2008 || Kitt Peak || Spacewatch ||  || align=right | 2.4 km || 
|-id=650 bgcolor=#d6d6d6
| 602650 ||  || — || August 28, 2009 || Kitt Peak || Spacewatch ||  || align=right | 2.1 km || 
|-id=651 bgcolor=#fefefe
| 602651 ||  || — || July 27, 2014 || Haleakala || Pan-STARRS ||  || align=right data-sort-value="0.49" | 490 m || 
|-id=652 bgcolor=#d6d6d6
| 602652 ||  || — || June 26, 2014 || Mount Lemmon || Mount Lemmon Survey ||  || align=right | 2.8 km || 
|-id=653 bgcolor=#d6d6d6
| 602653 ||  || — || April 14, 2013 || Mount Lemmon || Mount Lemmon Survey ||  || align=right | 2.4 km || 
|-id=654 bgcolor=#d6d6d6
| 602654 ||  || — || January 25, 2006 || Kitt Peak || Spacewatch || VER || align=right | 2.3 km || 
|-id=655 bgcolor=#d6d6d6
| 602655 ||  || — || July 3, 2014 || Haleakala || Pan-STARRS ||  || align=right | 2.1 km || 
|-id=656 bgcolor=#d6d6d6
| 602656 ||  || — || May 23, 2014 || Haleakala || Pan-STARRS ||  || align=right | 2.4 km || 
|-id=657 bgcolor=#d6d6d6
| 602657 ||  || — || June 26, 2014 || Mount Lemmon || Mount Lemmon Survey ||  || align=right | 1.9 km || 
|-id=658 bgcolor=#d6d6d6
| 602658 ||  || — || February 12, 2002 || Kitt Peak || Spacewatch ||  || align=right | 1.8 km || 
|-id=659 bgcolor=#d6d6d6
| 602659 ||  || — || January 2, 2012 || Kitt Peak || Spacewatch ||  || align=right | 2.2 km || 
|-id=660 bgcolor=#d6d6d6
| 602660 ||  || — || September 12, 2004 || Mauna Kea || Mauna Kea Obs. ||  || align=right | 1.7 km || 
|-id=661 bgcolor=#fefefe
| 602661 ||  || — || July 7, 2014 || Haleakala || Pan-STARRS ||  || align=right data-sort-value="0.55" | 550 m || 
|-id=662 bgcolor=#d6d6d6
| 602662 ||  || — || July 27, 2014 || Haleakala || Pan-STARRS ||  || align=right | 2.1 km || 
|-id=663 bgcolor=#d6d6d6
| 602663 ||  || — || July 27, 2014 || Haleakala || Pan-STARRS ||  || align=right | 3.5 km || 
|-id=664 bgcolor=#d6d6d6
| 602664 ||  || — || July 27, 2014 || Haleakala || Pan-STARRS ||  || align=right | 1.9 km || 
|-id=665 bgcolor=#fefefe
| 602665 ||  || — || February 17, 2010 || Kitt Peak || Spacewatch ||  || align=right data-sort-value="0.76" | 760 m || 
|-id=666 bgcolor=#d6d6d6
| 602666 ||  || — || July 27, 2014 || Haleakala || Pan-STARRS ||  || align=right | 2.2 km || 
|-id=667 bgcolor=#fefefe
| 602667 ||  || — || December 23, 2012 || Haleakala || Pan-STARRS ||  || align=right data-sort-value="0.57" | 570 m || 
|-id=668 bgcolor=#fefefe
| 602668 ||  || — || August 17, 2006 || Palomar || NEAT || H || align=right data-sort-value="0.79" | 790 m || 
|-id=669 bgcolor=#d6d6d6
| 602669 ||  || — || February 21, 2012 || Kitt Peak || Spacewatch ||  || align=right | 2.3 km || 
|-id=670 bgcolor=#d6d6d6
| 602670 ||  || — || March 14, 2013 || Kitt Peak || Spacewatch ||  || align=right | 2.2 km || 
|-id=671 bgcolor=#d6d6d6
| 602671 ||  || — || July 27, 2014 || Haleakala || Pan-STARRS ||  || align=right | 3.0 km || 
|-id=672 bgcolor=#fefefe
| 602672 ||  || — || September 23, 2011 || Haleakala || Pan-STARRS ||  || align=right data-sort-value="0.55" | 550 m || 
|-id=673 bgcolor=#fefefe
| 602673 ||  || — || July 27, 2014 || Haleakala || Pan-STARRS ||  || align=right data-sort-value="0.77" | 770 m || 
|-id=674 bgcolor=#fefefe
| 602674 ||  || — || April 19, 2009 || Kitt Peak || Spacewatch || V || align=right data-sort-value="0.75" | 750 m || 
|-id=675 bgcolor=#E9E9E9
| 602675 ||  || — || August 19, 2006 || Kitt Peak || Spacewatch ||  || align=right data-sort-value="0.44" | 440 m || 
|-id=676 bgcolor=#fefefe
| 602676 ||  || — || February 2, 2009 || Kitt Peak || Spacewatch ||  || align=right data-sort-value="0.58" | 580 m || 
|-id=677 bgcolor=#fefefe
| 602677 ||  || — || September 5, 2008 || Kitt Peak || Spacewatch ||  || align=right data-sort-value="0.54" | 540 m || 
|-id=678 bgcolor=#d6d6d6
| 602678 ||  || — || November 13, 2010 || Mount Lemmon || Mount Lemmon Survey ||  || align=right | 2.7 km || 
|-id=679 bgcolor=#d6d6d6
| 602679 ||  || — || May 10, 2014 || Kitt Peak || Spacewatch ||  || align=right | 2.3 km || 
|-id=680 bgcolor=#d6d6d6
| 602680 ||  || — || February 21, 2007 || Mount Lemmon || Mount Lemmon Survey ||  || align=right | 2.6 km || 
|-id=681 bgcolor=#d6d6d6
| 602681 ||  || — || August 27, 2009 || Kitt Peak || Spacewatch ||  || align=right | 2.8 km || 
|-id=682 bgcolor=#d6d6d6
| 602682 ||  || — || January 19, 2012 || Kitt Peak || Spacewatch ||  || align=right | 4.1 km || 
|-id=683 bgcolor=#d6d6d6
| 602683 ||  || — || July 27, 2014 || Haleakala || Pan-STARRS ||  || align=right | 3.2 km || 
|-id=684 bgcolor=#d6d6d6
| 602684 ||  || — || March 13, 2013 || Nogales || M. Schwartz, P. R. Holvorcem ||  || align=right | 2.7 km || 
|-id=685 bgcolor=#d6d6d6
| 602685 ||  || — || February 19, 2013 || Nogales || M. Schwartz, P. R. Holvorcem || TIR || align=right | 2.9 km || 
|-id=686 bgcolor=#d6d6d6
| 602686 ||  || — || June 1, 2002 || Palomar || NEAT ||  || align=right | 4.7 km || 
|-id=687 bgcolor=#d6d6d6
| 602687 ||  || — || June 27, 2014 || Haleakala || Pan-STARRS ||  || align=right | 2.8 km || 
|-id=688 bgcolor=#d6d6d6
| 602688 ||  || — || June 29, 2014 || Haleakala || Pan-STARRS ||  || align=right | 2.0 km || 
|-id=689 bgcolor=#d6d6d6
| 602689 ||  || — || January 14, 2012 || Kitt Peak || Spacewatch || Tj (2.93) || align=right | 3.9 km || 
|-id=690 bgcolor=#d6d6d6
| 602690 ||  || — || January 14, 2012 || Mount Lemmon || Mount Lemmon Survey ||  || align=right | 2.9 km || 
|-id=691 bgcolor=#fefefe
| 602691 ||  || — || October 16, 2003 || Kitt Peak || Spacewatch ||  || align=right data-sort-value="0.87" | 870 m || 
|-id=692 bgcolor=#d6d6d6
| 602692 ||  || — || December 2, 2010 || Mount Lemmon || Mount Lemmon Survey ||  || align=right | 2.7 km || 
|-id=693 bgcolor=#d6d6d6
| 602693 ||  || — || December 3, 2010 || Mount Lemmon || Mount Lemmon Survey ||  || align=right | 2.1 km || 
|-id=694 bgcolor=#d6d6d6
| 602694 ||  || — || July 29, 2014 || Haleakala || Pan-STARRS ||  || align=right | 2.5 km || 
|-id=695 bgcolor=#d6d6d6
| 602695 ||  || — || July 29, 2014 || Haleakala || Pan-STARRS ||  || align=right | 2.1 km || 
|-id=696 bgcolor=#d6d6d6
| 602696 ||  || — || April 11, 2013 || Kitt Peak || Spacewatch ||  || align=right | 2.2 km || 
|-id=697 bgcolor=#FA8072
| 602697 ||  || — || July 29, 2014 || Haleakala || Pan-STARRS ||  || align=right data-sort-value="0.73" | 730 m || 
|-id=698 bgcolor=#FA8072
| 602698 ||  || — || April 28, 2003 || Apache Point || SDSS Collaboration ||  || align=right | 1.8 km || 
|-id=699 bgcolor=#d6d6d6
| 602699 ||  || — || January 20, 2012 || Haleakala || Pan-STARRS ||  || align=right | 4.4 km || 
|-id=700 bgcolor=#d6d6d6
| 602700 ||  || — || March 15, 2012 || Mount Lemmon || Mount Lemmon Survey ||  || align=right | 3.0 km || 
|}

602701–602800 

|-bgcolor=#d6d6d6
| 602701 ||  || — || February 3, 2012 || Mount Lemmon || Mount Lemmon Survey ||  || align=right | 2.6 km || 
|-id=702 bgcolor=#d6d6d6
| 602702 ||  || — || September 17, 2003 || Palomar || NEAT || LUT || align=right | 5.3 km || 
|-id=703 bgcolor=#d6d6d6
| 602703 ||  || — || July 2, 2014 || Haleakala || Pan-STARRS ||  || align=right | 3.1 km || 
|-id=704 bgcolor=#d6d6d6
| 602704 ||  || — || September 17, 2009 || Mount Lemmon || Mount Lemmon Survey ||  || align=right | 2.4 km || 
|-id=705 bgcolor=#d6d6d6
| 602705 ||  || — || April 12, 2013 || Haleakala || Pan-STARRS ||  || align=right | 2.6 km || 
|-id=706 bgcolor=#d6d6d6
| 602706 ||  || — || June 29, 2014 || Haleakala || Pan-STARRS ||  || align=right | 2.7 km || 
|-id=707 bgcolor=#d6d6d6
| 602707 ||  || — || January 20, 2012 || Mount Lemmon || Mount Lemmon Survey ||  || align=right | 2.2 km || 
|-id=708 bgcolor=#fefefe
| 602708 ||  || — || September 26, 2011 || Kitt Peak || Spacewatch ||  || align=right data-sort-value="0.60" | 600 m || 
|-id=709 bgcolor=#d6d6d6
| 602709 ||  || — || May 8, 2013 || Haleakala || Pan-STARRS ||  || align=right | 2.4 km || 
|-id=710 bgcolor=#fefefe
| 602710 ||  || — || January 5, 2013 || Kitt Peak || Spacewatch || H || align=right data-sort-value="0.51" | 510 m || 
|-id=711 bgcolor=#d6d6d6
| 602711 ||  || — || July 25, 2014 || Haleakala || Pan-STARRS ||  || align=right | 2.1 km || 
|-id=712 bgcolor=#d6d6d6
| 602712 ||  || — || November 15, 2010 || Mount Lemmon || Mount Lemmon Survey ||  || align=right | 3.3 km || 
|-id=713 bgcolor=#d6d6d6
| 602713 ||  || — || July 28, 2014 || Haleakala || Pan-STARRS ||  || align=right | 3.0 km || 
|-id=714 bgcolor=#C2E0FF
| 602714 ||  || — || July 25, 2014 || Haleakala || Pan-STARRS || SDO || align=right | 132 km || 
|-id=715 bgcolor=#C2E0FF
| 602715 ||  || — || July 26, 2014 || Haleakala || Pan-STARRS || SDO || align=right | 139 km || 
|-id=716 bgcolor=#C2E0FF
| 602716 ||  || — || October 3, 2010 || Haleakala || Pan-STARRS || SDO || align=right | 268 km || 
|-id=717 bgcolor=#d6d6d6
| 602717 ||  || — || November 11, 2009 || Mount Lemmon || Mount Lemmon Survey ||  || align=right | 1.5 km || 
|-id=718 bgcolor=#d6d6d6
| 602718 ||  || — || July 31, 2014 || Haleakala || Pan-STARRS ||  || align=right | 2.0 km || 
|-id=719 bgcolor=#d6d6d6
| 602719 ||  || — || December 8, 2010 || Mount Lemmon || Mount Lemmon Survey ||  || align=right | 2.3 km || 
|-id=720 bgcolor=#E9E9E9
| 602720 ||  || — || December 31, 2011 || Kitt Peak || Spacewatch ||  || align=right | 1.1 km || 
|-id=721 bgcolor=#d6d6d6
| 602721 ||  || — || July 28, 2014 || Haleakala || Pan-STARRS ||  || align=right | 2.0 km || 
|-id=722 bgcolor=#fefefe
| 602722 ||  || — || July 25, 2014 || Haleakala || Pan-STARRS ||  || align=right data-sort-value="0.50" | 500 m || 
|-id=723 bgcolor=#d6d6d6
| 602723 ||  || — || July 29, 2014 || Haleakala || Pan-STARRS ||  || align=right | 2.1 km || 
|-id=724 bgcolor=#d6d6d6
| 602724 ||  || — || July 28, 2014 || Haleakala || Pan-STARRS ||  || align=right | 2.1 km || 
|-id=725 bgcolor=#fefefe
| 602725 ||  || — || November 25, 2005 || Mount Lemmon || Mount Lemmon Survey ||  || align=right data-sort-value="0.55" | 550 m || 
|-id=726 bgcolor=#d6d6d6
| 602726 ||  || — || July 25, 2014 || Haleakala || Pan-STARRS || Tj (2.99) || align=right | 3.2 km || 
|-id=727 bgcolor=#fefefe
| 602727 ||  || — || September 23, 2011 || Haleakala || Pan-STARRS ||  || align=right data-sort-value="0.61" | 610 m || 
|-id=728 bgcolor=#fefefe
| 602728 ||  || — || December 22, 2008 || Kitt Peak || Spacewatch ||  || align=right data-sort-value="0.50" | 500 m || 
|-id=729 bgcolor=#d6d6d6
| 602729 ||  || — || March 18, 2001 || Kitt Peak || Spacewatch ||  || align=right | 3.2 km || 
|-id=730 bgcolor=#E9E9E9
| 602730 ||  || — || April 14, 2005 || Catalina || CSS ||  || align=right data-sort-value="0.90" | 900 m || 
|-id=731 bgcolor=#d6d6d6
| 602731 ||  || — || August 4, 2014 || Haleakala || Pan-STARRS ||  || align=right | 3.2 km || 
|-id=732 bgcolor=#fefefe
| 602732 ||  || — || September 15, 2007 || Mount Lemmon || Mount Lemmon Survey ||  || align=right data-sort-value="0.65" | 650 m || 
|-id=733 bgcolor=#d6d6d6
| 602733 ||  || — || July 25, 2014 || Haleakala || Pan-STARRS ||  || align=right | 2.0 km || 
|-id=734 bgcolor=#d6d6d6
| 602734 ||  || — || August 18, 2009 || Kitt Peak || Spacewatch ||  || align=right | 1.8 km || 
|-id=735 bgcolor=#d6d6d6
| 602735 ||  || — || July 28, 2014 || Haleakala || Pan-STARRS ||  || align=right | 2.6 km || 
|-id=736 bgcolor=#d6d6d6
| 602736 ||  || — || May 7, 2014 || Haleakala || Pan-STARRS ||  || align=right | 2.6 km || 
|-id=737 bgcolor=#d6d6d6
| 602737 ||  || — || May 11, 2008 || Mount Lemmon || Mount Lemmon Survey ||  || align=right | 2.6 km || 
|-id=738 bgcolor=#fefefe
| 602738 ||  || — || January 17, 2013 || Haleakala || Pan-STARRS ||  || align=right data-sort-value="0.60" | 600 m || 
|-id=739 bgcolor=#fefefe
| 602739 ||  || — || May 22, 2001 || Cerro Tololo || J. L. Elliot, L. H. Wasserman ||  || align=right data-sort-value="0.47" | 470 m || 
|-id=740 bgcolor=#fefefe
| 602740 ||  || — || February 1, 2005 || Catalina || CSS || H || align=right data-sort-value="0.53" | 530 m || 
|-id=741 bgcolor=#d6d6d6
| 602741 ||  || — || November 23, 2009 || Mount Lemmon || Mount Lemmon Survey || 7:4 || align=right | 2.2 km || 
|-id=742 bgcolor=#fefefe
| 602742 ||  || — || January 5, 2006 || Kitt Peak || Spacewatch ||  || align=right data-sort-value="0.50" | 500 m || 
|-id=743 bgcolor=#fefefe
| 602743 ||  || — || April 25, 2007 || Kitt Peak || Spacewatch ||  || align=right data-sort-value="0.50" | 500 m || 
|-id=744 bgcolor=#d6d6d6
| 602744 ||  || — || January 22, 2006 || Mount Lemmon || Mount Lemmon Survey ||  || align=right | 2.9 km || 
|-id=745 bgcolor=#d6d6d6
| 602745 ||  || — || November 26, 2017 || Mount Lemmon || Mount Lemmon Survey ||  || align=right | 2.6 km || 
|-id=746 bgcolor=#d6d6d6
| 602746 ||  || — || August 3, 2014 || Haleakala || Pan-STARRS ||  || align=right | 2.3 km || 
|-id=747 bgcolor=#fefefe
| 602747 ||  || — || August 5, 2014 || Haleakala || Pan-STARRS ||  || align=right data-sort-value="0.44" | 440 m || 
|-id=748 bgcolor=#d6d6d6
| 602748 ||  || — || August 18, 2014 || Haleakala || Pan-STARRS ||  || align=right | 2.0 km || 
|-id=749 bgcolor=#d6d6d6
| 602749 ||  || — || September 30, 2009 || Mount Lemmon || Mount Lemmon Survey ||  || align=right | 2.5 km || 
|-id=750 bgcolor=#d6d6d6
| 602750 ||  || — || December 14, 2004 || Socorro || LINEAR ||  || align=right | 3.8 km || 
|-id=751 bgcolor=#d6d6d6
| 602751 ||  || — || October 1, 2003 || Kitt Peak || Spacewatch ||  || align=right | 3.2 km || 
|-id=752 bgcolor=#FA8072
| 602752 ||  || — || November 30, 2007 || Kitami || K. Endate ||  || align=right data-sort-value="0.79" | 790 m || 
|-id=753 bgcolor=#d6d6d6
| 602753 ||  || — || February 27, 2012 || Haleakala || Pan-STARRS ||  || align=right | 2.3 km || 
|-id=754 bgcolor=#d6d6d6
| 602754 ||  || — || July 3, 2014 || Haleakala || Pan-STARRS ||  || align=right | 2.5 km || 
|-id=755 bgcolor=#d6d6d6
| 602755 ||  || — || September 14, 2002 || Palomar || NEAT || 7:4 || align=right | 2.5 km || 
|-id=756 bgcolor=#d6d6d6
| 602756 ||  || — || January 20, 2012 || Haleakala || Pan-STARRS ||  || align=right | 3.2 km || 
|-id=757 bgcolor=#d6d6d6
| 602757 ||  || — || February 14, 2013 || Haleakala || Pan-STARRS ||  || align=right | 2.4 km || 
|-id=758 bgcolor=#d6d6d6
| 602758 ||  || — || November 5, 2010 || Mount Lemmon || Mount Lemmon Survey ||  || align=right | 2.2 km || 
|-id=759 bgcolor=#d6d6d6
| 602759 ||  || — || February 1, 2012 || Mount Lemmon || Mount Lemmon Survey ||  || align=right | 2.8 km || 
|-id=760 bgcolor=#d6d6d6
| 602760 ||  || — || July 28, 2014 || Haleakala || Pan-STARRS ||  || align=right | 2.5 km || 
|-id=761 bgcolor=#d6d6d6
| 602761 ||  || — || April 14, 2013 || ESA OGS || ESA OGS ||  || align=right | 2.1 km || 
|-id=762 bgcolor=#d6d6d6
| 602762 ||  || — || September 22, 2009 || Mount Lemmon || Mount Lemmon Survey ||  || align=right | 3.0 km || 
|-id=763 bgcolor=#fefefe
| 602763 ||  || — || September 28, 2008 || Mount Lemmon || Mount Lemmon Survey ||  || align=right data-sort-value="0.74" | 740 m || 
|-id=764 bgcolor=#d6d6d6
| 602764 ||  || — || March 15, 2012 || Mount Lemmon || Mount Lemmon Survey ||  || align=right | 2.5 km || 
|-id=765 bgcolor=#d6d6d6
| 602765 ||  || — || August 4, 2003 || Kitt Peak || Spacewatch ||  || align=right | 2.3 km || 
|-id=766 bgcolor=#d6d6d6
| 602766 ||  || — || July 26, 2014 || Haleakala || Pan-STARRS ||  || align=right | 2.2 km || 
|-id=767 bgcolor=#d6d6d6
| 602767 ||  || — || April 15, 2013 || Haleakala || Pan-STARRS ||  || align=right | 2.2 km || 
|-id=768 bgcolor=#d6d6d6
| 602768 ||  || — || June 3, 2014 || Haleakala || Pan-STARRS ||  || align=right | 3.2 km || 
|-id=769 bgcolor=#d6d6d6
| 602769 ||  || — || October 13, 2010 || Mount Lemmon || Mount Lemmon Survey ||  || align=right | 2.6 km || 
|-id=770 bgcolor=#d6d6d6
| 602770 ||  || — || August 20, 2014 || Haleakala || Pan-STARRS ||  || align=right | 2.1 km || 
|-id=771 bgcolor=#d6d6d6
| 602771 ||  || — || September 30, 2003 || Kitt Peak || Spacewatch ||  || align=right | 2.6 km || 
|-id=772 bgcolor=#fefefe
| 602772 ||  || — || February 15, 2013 || Haleakala || Pan-STARRS ||  || align=right data-sort-value="0.54" | 540 m || 
|-id=773 bgcolor=#d6d6d6
| 602773 ||  || — || January 28, 2011 || Mount Lemmon || Mount Lemmon Survey || 7:4 || align=right | 2.9 km || 
|-id=774 bgcolor=#d6d6d6
| 602774 ||  || — || September 28, 1998 || Kitt Peak || Spacewatch ||  || align=right | 1.9 km || 
|-id=775 bgcolor=#fefefe
| 602775 ||  || — || July 30, 2014 || Kitt Peak || Spacewatch ||  || align=right data-sort-value="0.46" | 460 m || 
|-id=776 bgcolor=#d6d6d6
| 602776 ||  || — || January 9, 2006 || Mount Lemmon || Mount Lemmon Survey ||  || align=right | 2.9 km || 
|-id=777 bgcolor=#fefefe
| 602777 ||  || — || September 14, 2007 || Mount Lemmon || Mount Lemmon Survey ||  || align=right data-sort-value="0.67" | 670 m || 
|-id=778 bgcolor=#fefefe
| 602778 ||  || — || March 7, 2013 || Mount Lemmon || Mount Lemmon Survey ||  || align=right data-sort-value="0.57" | 570 m || 
|-id=779 bgcolor=#fefefe
| 602779 ||  || — || August 20, 2014 || Haleakala || Pan-STARRS ||  || align=right data-sort-value="0.42" | 420 m || 
|-id=780 bgcolor=#fefefe
| 602780 ||  || — || August 24, 2003 || Cerro Tololo || Cerro Tololo Obs. ||  || align=right data-sort-value="0.49" | 490 m || 
|-id=781 bgcolor=#fefefe
| 602781 ||  || — || August 20, 2014 || Haleakala || Pan-STARRS ||  || align=right data-sort-value="0.69" | 690 m || 
|-id=782 bgcolor=#d6d6d6
| 602782 ||  || — || August 22, 2004 || Kitt Peak || Spacewatch ||  || align=right | 2.1 km || 
|-id=783 bgcolor=#d6d6d6
| 602783 ||  || — || June 27, 2014 || Haleakala || Pan-STARRS ||  || align=right | 2.6 km || 
|-id=784 bgcolor=#d6d6d6
| 602784 ||  || — || March 19, 2013 || Haleakala || Pan-STARRS ||  || align=right | 2.0 km || 
|-id=785 bgcolor=#d6d6d6
| 602785 ||  || — || April 17, 2013 || Haleakala || Pan-STARRS ||  || align=right | 2.4 km || 
|-id=786 bgcolor=#fefefe
| 602786 ||  || — || March 13, 2007 || Kitt Peak || Spacewatch ||  || align=right data-sort-value="0.59" | 590 m || 
|-id=787 bgcolor=#d6d6d6
| 602787 ||  || — || June 27, 2014 || Haleakala || Pan-STARRS ||  || align=right | 2.0 km || 
|-id=788 bgcolor=#fefefe
| 602788 ||  || — || July 23, 2003 || Palomar || NEAT || H || align=right data-sort-value="0.63" | 630 m || 
|-id=789 bgcolor=#d6d6d6
| 602789 ||  || — || February 5, 2011 || Mount Lemmon || Mount Lemmon Survey ||  || align=right | 2.5 km || 
|-id=790 bgcolor=#d6d6d6
| 602790 ||  || — || August 22, 2014 || Haleakala || Pan-STARRS ||  || align=right | 2.6 km || 
|-id=791 bgcolor=#fefefe
| 602791 ||  || — || September 26, 2008 || Kitt Peak || Spacewatch ||  || align=right data-sort-value="0.53" | 530 m || 
|-id=792 bgcolor=#fefefe
| 602792 ||  || — || September 30, 2011 || Kitt Peak || Spacewatch ||  || align=right data-sort-value="0.43" | 430 m || 
|-id=793 bgcolor=#d6d6d6
| 602793 ||  || — || September 18, 2003 || Palomar || NEAT ||  || align=right | 4.0 km || 
|-id=794 bgcolor=#d6d6d6
| 602794 ||  || — || August 27, 2009 || Kitt Peak || Spacewatch ||  || align=right | 2.2 km || 
|-id=795 bgcolor=#d6d6d6
| 602795 ||  || — || August 22, 2014 || Haleakala || Pan-STARRS ||  || align=right | 2.3 km || 
|-id=796 bgcolor=#fefefe
| 602796 ||  || — || August 22, 2014 || Haleakala || Pan-STARRS ||  || align=right data-sort-value="0.52" | 520 m || 
|-id=797 bgcolor=#d6d6d6
| 602797 ||  || — || August 22, 2014 || Haleakala || Pan-STARRS ||  || align=right | 2.8 km || 
|-id=798 bgcolor=#d6d6d6
| 602798 ||  || — || August 22, 2014 || Haleakala || Pan-STARRS || 7:4 || align=right | 2.8 km || 
|-id=799 bgcolor=#d6d6d6
| 602799 ||  || — || January 10, 2011 || Mount Lemmon || Mount Lemmon Survey ||  || align=right | 2.6 km || 
|-id=800 bgcolor=#d6d6d6
| 602800 ||  || — || November 10, 2010 || Mount Lemmon || Mount Lemmon Survey ||  || align=right | 2.9 km || 
|}

602801–602900 

|-bgcolor=#d6d6d6
| 602801 ||  || — || August 24, 2014 || Kitt Peak || Spacewatch ||  || align=right | 2.6 km || 
|-id=802 bgcolor=#fefefe
| 602802 ||  || — || October 21, 2011 || Kitt Peak || Spacewatch ||  || align=right data-sort-value="0.64" | 640 m || 
|-id=803 bgcolor=#d6d6d6
| 602803 ||  || — || April 17, 2013 || Haleakala || Pan-STARRS ||  || align=right | 2.8 km || 
|-id=804 bgcolor=#fefefe
| 602804 ||  || — || February 20, 2010 || Kitt Peak || Spacewatch ||  || align=right data-sort-value="0.59" | 590 m || 
|-id=805 bgcolor=#d6d6d6
| 602805 ||  || — || January 19, 2012 || Kitt Peak || Spacewatch ||  || align=right | 2.8 km || 
|-id=806 bgcolor=#d6d6d6
| 602806 ||  || — || December 1, 2005 || Mount Lemmon || Mount Lemmon Survey ||  || align=right | 2.7 km || 
|-id=807 bgcolor=#d6d6d6
| 602807 ||  || — || September 28, 2003 || Apache Point || SDSS Collaboration ||  || align=right | 2.8 km || 
|-id=808 bgcolor=#d6d6d6
| 602808 ||  || — || February 14, 2013 || Haleakala || Pan-STARRS ||  || align=right | 2.7 km || 
|-id=809 bgcolor=#d6d6d6
| 602809 ||  || — || April 21, 2012 || Haleakala || Pan-STARRS ||  || align=right | 2.9 km || 
|-id=810 bgcolor=#d6d6d6
| 602810 ||  || — || August 3, 2014 || Haleakala || Pan-STARRS ||  || align=right | 2.8 km || 
|-id=811 bgcolor=#d6d6d6
| 602811 ||  || — || August 25, 2014 || Haleakala || Pan-STARRS ||  || align=right | 2.7 km || 
|-id=812 bgcolor=#d6d6d6
| 602812 ||  || — || July 28, 2014 || Haleakala || Pan-STARRS ||  || align=right | 2.1 km || 
|-id=813 bgcolor=#fefefe
| 602813 ||  || — || March 8, 2013 || Haleakala || Pan-STARRS ||  || align=right data-sort-value="0.60" | 600 m || 
|-id=814 bgcolor=#d6d6d6
| 602814 ||  || — || September 20, 2009 || Mount Lemmon || Mount Lemmon Survey ||  || align=right | 3.0 km || 
|-id=815 bgcolor=#d6d6d6
| 602815 ||  || — || September 10, 2009 || Catalina || CSS ||  || align=right | 2.7 km || 
|-id=816 bgcolor=#d6d6d6
| 602816 ||  || — || February 21, 2007 || Mount Lemmon || Mount Lemmon Survey ||  || align=right | 2.5 km || 
|-id=817 bgcolor=#d6d6d6
| 602817 ||  || — || August 25, 2014 || Haleakala || Pan-STARRS ||  || align=right | 2.1 km || 
|-id=818 bgcolor=#fefefe
| 602818 ||  || — || March 8, 2013 || Haleakala || Pan-STARRS ||  || align=right data-sort-value="0.67" | 670 m || 
|-id=819 bgcolor=#d6d6d6
| 602819 ||  || — || July 6, 2014 || Haleakala || Pan-STARRS ||  || align=right | 1.9 km || 
|-id=820 bgcolor=#d6d6d6
| 602820 ||  || — || February 14, 2012 || Haleakala || Pan-STARRS ||  || align=right | 2.1 km || 
|-id=821 bgcolor=#d6d6d6
| 602821 ||  || — || September 26, 2003 || Apache Point || SDSS Collaboration ||  || align=right | 3.4 km || 
|-id=822 bgcolor=#fefefe
| 602822 ||  || — || August 20, 2014 || Haleakala || Pan-STARRS ||  || align=right data-sort-value="0.58" | 580 m || 
|-id=823 bgcolor=#d6d6d6
| 602823 ||  || — || August 27, 2014 || Haleakala || Pan-STARRS ||  || align=right | 2.4 km || 
|-id=824 bgcolor=#d6d6d6
| 602824 ||  || — || August 28, 2014 || Kitt Peak || Spacewatch || 7:4 || align=right | 2.5 km || 
|-id=825 bgcolor=#d6d6d6
| 602825 ||  || — || February 25, 2007 || Mount Lemmon || Mount Lemmon Survey ||  || align=right | 3.4 km || 
|-id=826 bgcolor=#d6d6d6
| 602826 ||  || — || September 4, 2008 || La Sagra || OAM Obs. || Tj (2.99) || align=right | 3.2 km || 
|-id=827 bgcolor=#d6d6d6
| 602827 ||  || — || October 16, 2009 || Mount Lemmon || Mount Lemmon Survey ||  || align=right | 2.5 km || 
|-id=828 bgcolor=#d6d6d6
| 602828 ||  || — || March 17, 2013 || Palomar || PTF ||  || align=right | 2.9 km || 
|-id=829 bgcolor=#d6d6d6
| 602829 ||  || — || August 6, 2014 || Haleakala || Pan-STARRS ||  || align=right | 2.1 km || 
|-id=830 bgcolor=#FA8072
| 602830 ||  || — || August 27, 2014 || Haleakala || Pan-STARRS ||  || align=right data-sort-value="0.53" | 530 m || 
|-id=831 bgcolor=#FA8072
| 602831 ||  || — || July 25, 2007 || Lulin || LUSS ||  || align=right data-sort-value="0.69" | 690 m || 
|-id=832 bgcolor=#d6d6d6
| 602832 ||  || — || September 21, 2003 || Campo Imperatore || A. Boattini, A. Di Paola ||  || align=right | 2.6 km || 
|-id=833 bgcolor=#E9E9E9
| 602833 ||  || — || August 22, 2014 || Haleakala || Pan-STARRS ||  || align=right | 2.4 km || 
|-id=834 bgcolor=#fefefe
| 602834 ||  || — || January 10, 2006 || Mount Lemmon || Mount Lemmon Survey ||  || align=right data-sort-value="0.59" | 590 m || 
|-id=835 bgcolor=#E9E9E9
| 602835 ||  || — || March 6, 2008 || Mount Lemmon || Mount Lemmon Survey ||  || align=right | 2.3 km || 
|-id=836 bgcolor=#fefefe
| 602836 ||  || — || October 23, 2003 || Kitt Peak || Spacewatch ||  || align=right data-sort-value="0.91" | 910 m || 
|-id=837 bgcolor=#d6d6d6
| 602837 ||  || — || April 17, 2013 || Haleakala || Pan-STARRS ||  || align=right | 2.6 km || 
|-id=838 bgcolor=#d6d6d6
| 602838 ||  || — || August 20, 2014 || Haleakala || Pan-STARRS ||  || align=right | 1.8 km || 
|-id=839 bgcolor=#fefefe
| 602839 ||  || — || August 20, 2014 || Haleakala || Pan-STARRS ||  || align=right data-sort-value="0.63" | 630 m || 
|-id=840 bgcolor=#fefefe
| 602840 ||  || — || August 31, 2014 || Haleakala || Pan-STARRS ||  || align=right data-sort-value="0.56" | 560 m || 
|-id=841 bgcolor=#d6d6d6
| 602841 ||  || — || August 25, 2014 || Haleakala || Pan-STARRS ||  || align=right | 2.6 km || 
|-id=842 bgcolor=#d6d6d6
| 602842 ||  || — || October 24, 2009 || Kitt Peak || Spacewatch ||  || align=right | 2.7 km || 
|-id=843 bgcolor=#d6d6d6
| 602843 ||  || — || August 20, 2014 || Haleakala || Pan-STARRS ||  || align=right | 2.8 km || 
|-id=844 bgcolor=#d6d6d6
| 602844 ||  || — || August 20, 2014 || Haleakala || Pan-STARRS ||  || align=right | 2.6 km || 
|-id=845 bgcolor=#d6d6d6
| 602845 ||  || — || August 20, 2014 || Haleakala || Pan-STARRS ||  || align=right | 2.3 km || 
|-id=846 bgcolor=#d6d6d6
| 602846 ||  || — || August 28, 2014 || Haleakala || Pan-STARRS ||  || align=right | 2.3 km || 
|-id=847 bgcolor=#d6d6d6
| 602847 ||  || — || August 28, 2014 || Haleakala || Pan-STARRS ||  || align=right | 1.9 km || 
|-id=848 bgcolor=#d6d6d6
| 602848 ||  || — || September 16, 2003 || Kitt Peak || Spacewatch ||  || align=right | 2.1 km || 
|-id=849 bgcolor=#E9E9E9
| 602849 ||  || — || August 25, 2014 || Haleakala || Pan-STARRS ||  || align=right | 1.0 km || 
|-id=850 bgcolor=#fefefe
| 602850 ||  || — || August 25, 2014 || Haleakala || Pan-STARRS ||  || align=right data-sort-value="0.63" | 630 m || 
|-id=851 bgcolor=#E9E9E9
| 602851 ||  || — || June 28, 2014 || Haleakala || Pan-STARRS ||  || align=right | 2.1 km || 
|-id=852 bgcolor=#d6d6d6
| 602852 ||  || — || June 28, 2014 || Haleakala || Pan-STARRS ||  || align=right | 3.2 km || 
|-id=853 bgcolor=#E9E9E9
| 602853 ||  || — || August 28, 2014 || Haleakala || Pan-STARRS ||  || align=right | 1.8 km || 
|-id=854 bgcolor=#E9E9E9
| 602854 ||  || — || January 12, 2003 || Palomar || NEAT ||  || align=right | 1.3 km || 
|-id=855 bgcolor=#d6d6d6
| 602855 ||  || — || April 18, 2013 || Mount Lemmon || Mount Lemmon Survey ||  || align=right | 3.2 km || 
|-id=856 bgcolor=#fefefe
| 602856 ||  || — || November 18, 1996 || Kitt Peak || Spacewatch ||  || align=right data-sort-value="0.66" | 660 m || 
|-id=857 bgcolor=#d6d6d6
| 602857 ||  || — || July 28, 2014 || Haleakala || Pan-STARRS ||  || align=right | 1.5 km || 
|-id=858 bgcolor=#d6d6d6
| 602858 ||  || — || September 25, 1998 || Kitt Peak || Spacewatch ||  || align=right | 1.8 km || 
|-id=859 bgcolor=#d6d6d6
| 602859 ||  || — || September 18, 2003 || Haleakala || AMOS ||  || align=right | 3.7 km || 
|-id=860 bgcolor=#fefefe
| 602860 ||  || — || April 20, 2006 || Kitt Peak || Spacewatch ||  || align=right data-sort-value="0.71" | 710 m || 
|-id=861 bgcolor=#d6d6d6
| 602861 ||  || — || July 30, 2014 || Kitt Peak || Spacewatch ||  || align=right | 2.4 km || 
|-id=862 bgcolor=#d6d6d6
| 602862 ||  || — || September 15, 2014 || Mount Lemmon || Mount Lemmon Survey ||  || align=right | 2.1 km || 
|-id=863 bgcolor=#E9E9E9
| 602863 ||  || — || September 2, 2014 || Haleakala || Pan-STARRS ||  || align=right data-sort-value="0.96" | 960 m || 
|-id=864 bgcolor=#d6d6d6
| 602864 ||  || — || September 1, 2014 || Mount Lemmon || Mount Lemmon Survey ||  || align=right | 1.9 km || 
|-id=865 bgcolor=#d6d6d6
| 602865 ||  || — || January 26, 2006 || Kitt Peak || Spacewatch ||  || align=right | 2.4 km || 
|-id=866 bgcolor=#fefefe
| 602866 ||  || — || April 10, 2013 || Haleakala || Pan-STARRS ||  || align=right data-sort-value="0.50" | 500 m || 
|-id=867 bgcolor=#d6d6d6
| 602867 ||  || — || January 23, 2006 || Kitt Peak || Spacewatch ||  || align=right | 2.6 km || 
|-id=868 bgcolor=#fefefe
| 602868 ||  || — || March 15, 2013 || Mount Lemmon || Mount Lemmon Survey ||  || align=right data-sort-value="0.59" | 590 m || 
|-id=869 bgcolor=#d6d6d6
| 602869 ||  || — || February 12, 2011 || Mount Lemmon || Mount Lemmon Survey ||  || align=right | 2.8 km || 
|-id=870 bgcolor=#fefefe
| 602870 ||  || — || January 22, 2006 || Mount Lemmon || Mount Lemmon Survey ||  || align=right data-sort-value="0.53" | 530 m || 
|-id=871 bgcolor=#fefefe
| 602871 ||  || — || March 12, 2010 || Kitt Peak || Spacewatch ||  || align=right data-sort-value="0.55" | 550 m || 
|-id=872 bgcolor=#d6d6d6
| 602872 ||  || — || September 28, 2009 || Mount Lemmon || Mount Lemmon Survey ||  || align=right | 3.1 km || 
|-id=873 bgcolor=#d6d6d6
| 602873 ||  || — || June 7, 2013 || Haleakala || Pan-STARRS ||  || align=right | 2.4 km || 
|-id=874 bgcolor=#d6d6d6
| 602874 ||  || — || October 16, 2009 || Mount Lemmon || Mount Lemmon Survey ||  || align=right | 2.1 km || 
|-id=875 bgcolor=#fefefe
| 602875 ||  || — || October 23, 2011 || Mount Lemmon || Mount Lemmon Survey ||  || align=right data-sort-value="0.58" | 580 m || 
|-id=876 bgcolor=#fefefe
| 602876 ||  || — || December 4, 2007 || Kitt Peak || Spacewatch ||  || align=right data-sort-value="0.67" | 670 m || 
|-id=877 bgcolor=#E9E9E9
| 602877 ||  || — || February 7, 2003 || La Silla ||  ||  || align=right | 1.7 km || 
|-id=878 bgcolor=#d6d6d6
| 602878 ||  || — || February 7, 2011 || Mount Lemmon || Mount Lemmon Survey || 7:4 || align=right | 2.7 km || 
|-id=879 bgcolor=#fefefe
| 602879 ||  || — || October 28, 2011 || Mount Lemmon || Mount Lemmon Survey ||  || align=right data-sort-value="0.63" | 630 m || 
|-id=880 bgcolor=#E9E9E9
| 602880 ||  || — || July 30, 2000 || Cerro Tololo || M. W. Buie, S. D. Kern ||  || align=right | 1.7 km || 
|-id=881 bgcolor=#d6d6d6
| 602881 ||  || — || February 11, 2011 || Mount Lemmon || Mount Lemmon Survey || 7:4 || align=right | 2.7 km || 
|-id=882 bgcolor=#E9E9E9
| 602882 ||  || — || March 18, 2005 || Catalina || CSS ||  || align=right | 1.1 km || 
|-id=883 bgcolor=#fefefe
| 602883 ||  || — || February 13, 2013 || ESA OGS || ESA OGS ||  || align=right data-sort-value="0.66" | 660 m || 
|-id=884 bgcolor=#d6d6d6
| 602884 ||  || — || September 18, 2003 || Palomar || NEAT ||  || align=right | 2.4 km || 
|-id=885 bgcolor=#FA8072
| 602885 ||  || — || August 28, 2014 || Kitt Peak || Spacewatch ||  || align=right data-sort-value="0.88" | 880 m || 
|-id=886 bgcolor=#fefefe
| 602886 ||  || — || January 26, 2009 || Mount Lemmon || Mount Lemmon Survey ||  || align=right data-sort-value="0.61" | 610 m || 
|-id=887 bgcolor=#d6d6d6
| 602887 ||  || — || August 31, 2007 || Siding Spring || K. Sárneczky, L. Kiss || 7:4 || align=right | 2.9 km || 
|-id=888 bgcolor=#d6d6d6
| 602888 ||  || — || September 18, 2014 || Haleakala || Pan-STARRS ||  || align=right | 1.9 km || 
|-id=889 bgcolor=#fefefe
| 602889 ||  || — || December 30, 2007 || Kitt Peak || Spacewatch ||  || align=right data-sort-value="0.62" | 620 m || 
|-id=890 bgcolor=#d6d6d6
| 602890 ||  || — || March 29, 2011 || Mount Lemmon || Mount Lemmon Survey ||  || align=right | 2.7 km || 
|-id=891 bgcolor=#fefefe
| 602891 ||  || — || January 3, 2012 || Kitt Peak || Spacewatch ||  || align=right data-sort-value="0.40" | 400 m || 
|-id=892 bgcolor=#E9E9E9
| 602892 ||  || — || July 31, 2014 || Haleakala || Pan-STARRS ||  || align=right | 2.2 km || 
|-id=893 bgcolor=#d6d6d6
| 602893 ||  || — || January 30, 2011 || Haleakala || Pan-STARRS ||  || align=right | 2.1 km || 
|-id=894 bgcolor=#fefefe
| 602894 ||  || — || August 19, 2014 || Haleakala || Pan-STARRS ||  || align=right data-sort-value="0.67" | 670 m || 
|-id=895 bgcolor=#d6d6d6
| 602895 ||  || — || October 22, 2009 || Mount Lemmon || Mount Lemmon Survey ||  || align=right | 3.8 km || 
|-id=896 bgcolor=#d6d6d6
| 602896 ||  || — || September 23, 2009 || Mount Lemmon || Mount Lemmon Survey ||  || align=right | 3.2 km || 
|-id=897 bgcolor=#fefefe
| 602897 ||  || — || June 21, 2007 || Kitt Peak || Spacewatch ||  || align=right data-sort-value="0.49" | 490 m || 
|-id=898 bgcolor=#d6d6d6
| 602898 ||  || — || September 25, 1998 || Kitt Peak || Spacewatch ||  || align=right | 2.7 km || 
|-id=899 bgcolor=#fefefe
| 602899 ||  || — || January 31, 2009 || Mount Lemmon || Mount Lemmon Survey ||  || align=right data-sort-value="0.46" | 460 m || 
|-id=900 bgcolor=#fefefe
| 602900 ||  || — || September 20, 2014 || Haleakala || Pan-STARRS ||  || align=right data-sort-value="0.51" | 510 m || 
|}

602901–603000 

|-bgcolor=#d6d6d6
| 602901 ||  || — || October 31, 2005 || Mount Lemmon || Mount Lemmon Survey ||  || align=right | 1.9 km || 
|-id=902 bgcolor=#d6d6d6
| 602902 ||  || — || September 20, 2014 || Haleakala || Pan-STARRS || 615 || align=right | 1.2 km || 
|-id=903 bgcolor=#fefefe
| 602903 ||  || — || February 17, 2013 || Kitt Peak || Spacewatch ||  || align=right data-sort-value="0.64" | 640 m || 
|-id=904 bgcolor=#d6d6d6
| 602904 ||  || — || February 9, 2005 || Kitt Peak || Spacewatch ||  || align=right | 2.2 km || 
|-id=905 bgcolor=#fefefe
| 602905 ||  || — || October 23, 2001 || Kitt Peak || Spacewatch ||  || align=right data-sort-value="0.66" | 660 m || 
|-id=906 bgcolor=#fefefe
| 602906 ||  || — || November 22, 2011 || Mount Lemmon || Mount Lemmon Survey ||  || align=right data-sort-value="0.72" | 720 m || 
|-id=907 bgcolor=#fefefe
| 602907 ||  || — || July 30, 2014 || Haleakala || Pan-STARRS ||  || align=right data-sort-value="0.63" | 630 m || 
|-id=908 bgcolor=#d6d6d6
| 602908 ||  || — || August 27, 2014 || Haleakala || Pan-STARRS ||  || align=right | 1.7 km || 
|-id=909 bgcolor=#d6d6d6
| 602909 ||  || — || March 16, 2005 || Mount Lemmon || Mount Lemmon Survey ||  || align=right | 2.6 km || 
|-id=910 bgcolor=#E9E9E9
| 602910 ||  || — || July 29, 2014 || Haleakala || Pan-STARRS ||  || align=right | 1.2 km || 
|-id=911 bgcolor=#fefefe
| 602911 ||  || — || December 31, 2007 || Kitt Peak || Spacewatch ||  || align=right data-sort-value="0.60" | 600 m || 
|-id=912 bgcolor=#d6d6d6
| 602912 ||  || — || September 24, 2009 || Mount Lemmon || Mount Lemmon Survey ||  || align=right | 2.5 km || 
|-id=913 bgcolor=#fefefe
| 602913 ||  || — || July 31, 2014 || Haleakala || Pan-STARRS ||  || align=right data-sort-value="0.57" | 570 m || 
|-id=914 bgcolor=#fefefe
| 602914 ||  || — || April 14, 2010 || Kitt Peak || Spacewatch ||  || align=right data-sort-value="0.72" | 720 m || 
|-id=915 bgcolor=#fefefe
| 602915 ||  || — || October 26, 2011 || Haleakala || Pan-STARRS ||  || align=right data-sort-value="0.60" | 600 m || 
|-id=916 bgcolor=#fefefe
| 602916 ||  || — || September 9, 2007 || Kitt Peak || Spacewatch ||  || align=right data-sort-value="0.58" | 580 m || 
|-id=917 bgcolor=#d6d6d6
| 602917 ||  || — || September 19, 2014 || Haleakala || Pan-STARRS ||  || align=right | 2.2 km || 
|-id=918 bgcolor=#fefefe
| 602918 ||  || — || January 7, 2006 || Kitt Peak || Spacewatch ||  || align=right data-sort-value="0.59" | 590 m || 
|-id=919 bgcolor=#d6d6d6
| 602919 ||  || — || September 24, 2014 || Mount Lemmon || Mount Lemmon Survey ||  || align=right | 2.3 km || 
|-id=920 bgcolor=#fefefe
| 602920 ||  || — || October 8, 2004 || Kitt Peak || Spacewatch ||  || align=right data-sort-value="0.61" | 610 m || 
|-id=921 bgcolor=#d6d6d6
| 602921 ||  || — || September 24, 2014 || Kitt Peak || Spacewatch ||  || align=right | 2.4 km || 
|-id=922 bgcolor=#d6d6d6
| 602922 ||  || — || September 30, 2014 || Piszkesteto || P. Székely ||  || align=right | 3.3 km || 
|-id=923 bgcolor=#fefefe
| 602923 ||  || — || August 25, 2014 || Haleakala || Pan-STARRS ||  || align=right data-sort-value="0.59" | 590 m || 
|-id=924 bgcolor=#d6d6d6
| 602924 ||  || — || September 30, 2009 || Mount Lemmon || Mount Lemmon Survey ||  || align=right | 2.5 km || 
|-id=925 bgcolor=#fefefe
| 602925 ||  || — || October 25, 2011 || Haleakala || Pan-STARRS ||  || align=right data-sort-value="0.64" | 640 m || 
|-id=926 bgcolor=#fefefe
| 602926 ||  || — || October 11, 2007 || Mount Lemmon || Mount Lemmon Survey ||  || align=right data-sort-value="0.62" | 620 m || 
|-id=927 bgcolor=#d6d6d6
| 602927 ||  || — || September 29, 2014 || Haleakala || Pan-STARRS ||  || align=right | 2.6 km || 
|-id=928 bgcolor=#fefefe
| 602928 ||  || — || September 20, 2014 || Haleakala || Pan-STARRS ||  || align=right data-sort-value="0.62" | 620 m || 
|-id=929 bgcolor=#d6d6d6
| 602929 ||  || — || September 19, 2014 || Haleakala || Pan-STARRS ||  || align=right | 2.5 km || 
|-id=930 bgcolor=#fefefe
| 602930 ||  || — || September 20, 2014 || Haleakala || Pan-STARRS ||  || align=right data-sort-value="0.50" | 500 m || 
|-id=931 bgcolor=#fefefe
| 602931 ||  || — || November 24, 2014 || Mount Lemmon || Mount Lemmon Survey ||  || align=right data-sort-value="0.68" | 680 m || 
|-id=932 bgcolor=#fefefe
| 602932 ||  || — || September 24, 2014 || Mount Lemmon || Mount Lemmon Survey ||  || align=right data-sort-value="0.98" | 980 m || 
|-id=933 bgcolor=#fefefe
| 602933 ||  || — || November 27, 2014 || Haleakala || Pan-STARRS ||  || align=right data-sort-value="0.45" | 450 m || 
|-id=934 bgcolor=#d6d6d6
| 602934 ||  || — || September 19, 2014 || Haleakala || Pan-STARRS || 7:4 || align=right | 2.9 km || 
|-id=935 bgcolor=#fefefe
| 602935 ||  || — || September 19, 2014 || Haleakala || Pan-STARRS ||  || align=right data-sort-value="0.59" | 590 m || 
|-id=936 bgcolor=#fefefe
| 602936 ||  || — || September 19, 2014 || Haleakala || Pan-STARRS ||  || align=right data-sort-value="0.52" | 520 m || 
|-id=937 bgcolor=#d6d6d6
| 602937 ||  || — || September 17, 2014 || Haleakala || Pan-STARRS ||  || align=right | 2.0 km || 
|-id=938 bgcolor=#E9E9E9
| 602938 ||  || — || July 5, 2014 || Haleakala || Pan-STARRS ||  || align=right | 1.1 km || 
|-id=939 bgcolor=#E9E9E9
| 602939 ||  || — || September 18, 2014 || Haleakala || Pan-STARRS ||  || align=right data-sort-value="0.69" | 690 m || 
|-id=940 bgcolor=#fefefe
| 602940 ||  || — || September 15, 2007 || Lulin || LUSS ||  || align=right data-sort-value="0.62" | 620 m || 
|-id=941 bgcolor=#d6d6d6
| 602941 ||  || — || October 21, 2003 || Kitt Peak || Spacewatch ||  || align=right | 3.7 km || 
|-id=942 bgcolor=#fefefe
| 602942 ||  || — || July 31, 2000 || Cerro Tololo || M. W. Buie, S. D. Kern ||  || align=right data-sort-value="0.46" | 460 m || 
|-id=943 bgcolor=#d6d6d6
| 602943 ||  || — || October 30, 2009 || Mount Lemmon || Mount Lemmon Survey ||  || align=right | 3.1 km || 
|-id=944 bgcolor=#d6d6d6
| 602944 ||  || — || October 1, 2014 || Haleakala || Pan-STARRS ||  || align=right | 2.7 km || 
|-id=945 bgcolor=#d6d6d6
| 602945 ||  || — || September 18, 2003 || Kitt Peak || Spacewatch ||  || align=right | 3.7 km || 
|-id=946 bgcolor=#E9E9E9
| 602946 ||  || — || September 4, 2014 || Haleakala || Pan-STARRS ||  || align=right | 1.4 km || 
|-id=947 bgcolor=#fefefe
| 602947 ||  || — || October 12, 2007 || Kitt Peak || Spacewatch ||  || align=right data-sort-value="0.65" | 650 m || 
|-id=948 bgcolor=#E9E9E9
| 602948 ||  || — || October 3, 2014 || Mount Lemmon || Mount Lemmon Survey ||  || align=right | 1.0 km || 
|-id=949 bgcolor=#fefefe
| 602949 ||  || — || October 13, 2004 || Moletai || K. Černis, J. Zdanavičius ||  || align=right data-sort-value="0.71" | 710 m || 
|-id=950 bgcolor=#fefefe
| 602950 ||  || — || March 2, 2005 || Kitt Peak || Spacewatch ||  || align=right data-sort-value="0.63" | 630 m || 
|-id=951 bgcolor=#d6d6d6
| 602951 ||  || — || September 28, 2003 || Kitt Peak || Spacewatch ||  || align=right | 3.1 km || 
|-id=952 bgcolor=#fefefe
| 602952 ||  || — || March 4, 2006 || Mount Lemmon || Mount Lemmon Survey ||  || align=right data-sort-value="0.63" | 630 m || 
|-id=953 bgcolor=#fefefe
| 602953 ||  || — || September 14, 2007 || Mount Lemmon || Mount Lemmon Survey ||  || align=right data-sort-value="0.58" | 580 m || 
|-id=954 bgcolor=#fefefe
| 602954 ||  || — || September 14, 2007 || Mount Lemmon || Mount Lemmon Survey ||  || align=right data-sort-value="0.50" | 500 m || 
|-id=955 bgcolor=#fefefe
| 602955 ||  || — || January 14, 2002 || Palomar || NEAT ||  || align=right data-sort-value="0.83" | 830 m || 
|-id=956 bgcolor=#fefefe
| 602956 ||  || — || October 24, 2011 || Haleakala || Pan-STARRS ||  || align=right data-sort-value="0.68" | 680 m || 
|-id=957 bgcolor=#fefefe
| 602957 ||  || — || October 2, 2014 || Haleakala || Pan-STARRS ||  || align=right data-sort-value="0.52" | 520 m || 
|-id=958 bgcolor=#fefefe
| 602958 ||  || — || March 10, 2016 || Haleakala || Pan-STARRS ||  || align=right data-sort-value="0.49" | 490 m || 
|-id=959 bgcolor=#E9E9E9
| 602959 ||  || — || October 18, 2014 || Mount Lemmon || Mount Lemmon Survey ||  || align=right data-sort-value="0.81" | 810 m || 
|-id=960 bgcolor=#fefefe
| 602960 ||  || — || October 3, 2014 || Kitt Peak || Spacewatch || H || align=right data-sort-value="0.54" | 540 m || 
|-id=961 bgcolor=#E9E9E9
| 602961 ||  || — || October 20, 2014 || Mount Lemmon || Mount Lemmon Survey ||  || align=right | 1.8 km || 
|-id=962 bgcolor=#fefefe
| 602962 ||  || — || September 12, 2007 || Mount Lemmon || Mount Lemmon Survey ||  || align=right data-sort-value="0.53" | 530 m || 
|-id=963 bgcolor=#fefefe
| 602963 ||  || — || November 3, 2007 || Kitt Peak || Spacewatch ||  || align=right data-sort-value="0.66" | 660 m || 
|-id=964 bgcolor=#E9E9E9
| 602964 ||  || — || November 10, 2001 || Socorro || LINEAR ||  || align=right | 1.7 km || 
|-id=965 bgcolor=#fefefe
| 602965 ||  || — || February 1, 2009 || Kitt Peak || Spacewatch ||  || align=right data-sort-value="0.64" | 640 m || 
|-id=966 bgcolor=#E9E9E9
| 602966 ||  || — || October 5, 2014 || Mount Lemmon || Mount Lemmon Survey ||  || align=right | 1.1 km || 
|-id=967 bgcolor=#fefefe
| 602967 ||  || — || October 10, 2007 || Mount Lemmon || Mount Lemmon Survey ||  || align=right data-sort-value="0.69" | 690 m || 
|-id=968 bgcolor=#d6d6d6
| 602968 ||  || — || October 22, 2009 || Mount Lemmon || Mount Lemmon Survey ||  || align=right | 2.2 km || 
|-id=969 bgcolor=#fefefe
| 602969 ||  || — || March 3, 2005 || Catalina || CSS ||  || align=right data-sort-value="0.68" | 680 m || 
|-id=970 bgcolor=#E9E9E9
| 602970 ||  || — || October 20, 2014 || Mount Lemmon || Mount Lemmon Survey ||  || align=right | 1.1 km || 
|-id=971 bgcolor=#E9E9E9
| 602971 ||  || — || April 21, 2012 || Mount Lemmon || Mount Lemmon Survey ||  || align=right data-sort-value="0.87" | 870 m || 
|-id=972 bgcolor=#fefefe
| 602972 ||  || — || January 17, 2005 || Kitt Peak || Spacewatch ||  || align=right data-sort-value="0.68" | 680 m || 
|-id=973 bgcolor=#fefefe
| 602973 ||  || — || October 13, 2014 || Mount Lemmon || Mount Lemmon Survey ||  || align=right data-sort-value="0.63" | 630 m || 
|-id=974 bgcolor=#d6d6d6
| 602974 ||  || — || April 21, 2006 || Mount Lemmon || Mount Lemmon Survey ||  || align=right | 2.4 km || 
|-id=975 bgcolor=#E9E9E9
| 602975 ||  || — || October 21, 2014 || Mount Lemmon || Mount Lemmon Survey ||  || align=right | 1.3 km || 
|-id=976 bgcolor=#fefefe
| 602976 ||  || — || February 14, 2012 || Haleakala || Pan-STARRS ||  || align=right data-sort-value="0.65" | 650 m || 
|-id=977 bgcolor=#fefefe
| 602977 ||  || — || November 9, 2007 || Mount Lemmon || Mount Lemmon Survey ||  || align=right data-sort-value="0.61" | 610 m || 
|-id=978 bgcolor=#fefefe
| 602978 ||  || — || September 12, 2007 || Mount Lemmon || Mount Lemmon Survey ||  || align=right data-sort-value="0.68" | 680 m || 
|-id=979 bgcolor=#d6d6d6
| 602979 ||  || — || October 23, 2014 || Kitt Peak || Spacewatch ||  || align=right | 2.7 km || 
|-id=980 bgcolor=#fefefe
| 602980 ||  || — || October 10, 2007 || Kitt Peak || Spacewatch ||  || align=right data-sort-value="0.55" | 550 m || 
|-id=981 bgcolor=#fefefe
| 602981 ||  || — || March 15, 2013 || Kitt Peak || Spacewatch ||  || align=right data-sort-value="0.74" | 740 m || 
|-id=982 bgcolor=#fefefe
| 602982 ||  || — || October 26, 2011 || Haleakala || Pan-STARRS ||  || align=right data-sort-value="0.52" | 520 m || 
|-id=983 bgcolor=#d6d6d6
| 602983 ||  || — || November 11, 2009 || Kitt Peak || Spacewatch ||  || align=right | 2.6 km || 
|-id=984 bgcolor=#fefefe
| 602984 ||  || — || September 8, 2007 || Andrushivka || O. Geraščenko ||  || align=right data-sort-value="0.88" | 880 m || 
|-id=985 bgcolor=#d6d6d6
| 602985 ||  || — || January 16, 2011 || Mount Lemmon || Mount Lemmon Survey ||  || align=right | 3.4 km || 
|-id=986 bgcolor=#fefefe
| 602986 ||  || — || May 20, 2006 || Kitt Peak || Spacewatch ||  || align=right data-sort-value="0.57" | 570 m || 
|-id=987 bgcolor=#fefefe
| 602987 ||  || — || February 25, 2006 || Kitt Peak || Spacewatch ||  || align=right data-sort-value="0.50" | 500 m || 
|-id=988 bgcolor=#d6d6d6
| 602988 ||  || — || September 16, 2003 || Kitt Peak || Spacewatch ||  || align=right | 2.0 km || 
|-id=989 bgcolor=#d6d6d6
| 602989 ||  || — || September 16, 2009 || Kitt Peak || Spacewatch ||  || align=right | 1.6 km || 
|-id=990 bgcolor=#d6d6d6
| 602990 ||  || — || October 25, 2014 || Haleakala || Pan-STARRS || Tj (2.98) || align=right | 3.0 km || 
|-id=991 bgcolor=#fefefe
| 602991 ||  || — || January 30, 2009 || Mount Lemmon || Mount Lemmon Survey ||  || align=right data-sort-value="0.69" | 690 m || 
|-id=992 bgcolor=#fefefe
| 602992 ||  || — || May 6, 2006 || Kitt Peak || Spacewatch ||  || align=right data-sort-value="0.80" | 800 m || 
|-id=993 bgcolor=#d6d6d6
| 602993 ||  || — || September 2, 1998 || Kitt Peak || Spacewatch ||  || align=right | 2.7 km || 
|-id=994 bgcolor=#fefefe
| 602994 ||  || — || October 26, 2014 || Mount Lemmon || Mount Lemmon Survey ||  || align=right data-sort-value="0.68" | 680 m || 
|-id=995 bgcolor=#C2FFFF
| 602995 ||  || — || October 26, 2014 || Mount Lemmon || Mount Lemmon Survey || L5 || align=right | 6.7 km || 
|-id=996 bgcolor=#fefefe
| 602996 ||  || — || September 18, 2003 || Kitt Peak || Spacewatch ||  || align=right data-sort-value="0.79" | 790 m || 
|-id=997 bgcolor=#fefefe
| 602997 ||  || — || October 7, 2005 || Mauna Kea || Mauna Kea Obs. ||  || align=right data-sort-value="0.73" | 730 m || 
|-id=998 bgcolor=#fefefe
| 602998 ||  || — || July 23, 2001 || Haleakala || AMOS ||  || align=right data-sort-value="0.69" | 690 m || 
|-id=999 bgcolor=#fefefe
| 602999 ||  || — || September 13, 2007 || Mount Lemmon || Mount Lemmon Survey ||  || align=right data-sort-value="0.63" | 630 m || 
|-id=000 bgcolor=#E9E9E9
| 603000 ||  || — || October 28, 2001 || Palomar || NEAT ||  || align=right | 2.1 km || 
|}

References

External links 
 Discovery Circumstances: Numbered Minor Planets (600001)–(605000) (IAU Minor Planet Center)

0602